

333001–333100 

|-bgcolor=#d6d6d6
| 333001 ||  || — || September 11, 2007 || Mount Lemmon || Mount Lemmon Survey || — || align=right | 3.6 km || 
|-id=002 bgcolor=#fefefe
| 333002 ||  || — || November 20, 2001 || Socorro || LINEAR || SVE || align=right | 1.9 km || 
|-id=003 bgcolor=#d6d6d6
| 333003 ||  || — || October 27, 2008 || Mount Lemmon || Mount Lemmon Survey || — || align=right | 3.8 km || 
|-id=004 bgcolor=#d6d6d6
| 333004 ||  || — || March 11, 2005 || Kitt Peak || Spacewatch || — || align=right | 3.3 km || 
|-id=005 bgcolor=#d6d6d6
| 333005 ||  || — || February 13, 2010 || Mount Lemmon || Mount Lemmon Survey || — || align=right | 3.6 km || 
|-id=006 bgcolor=#d6d6d6
| 333006 ||  || — || February 16, 2004 || Kitt Peak || Spacewatch || — || align=right | 3.5 km || 
|-id=007 bgcolor=#d6d6d6
| 333007 ||  || — || October 3, 2002 || Palomar || NEAT || — || align=right | 4.5 km || 
|-id=008 bgcolor=#E9E9E9
| 333008 ||  || — || October 7, 2007 || Kitt Peak || Spacewatch || MRX || align=right | 1.1 km || 
|-id=009 bgcolor=#E9E9E9
| 333009 ||  || — || May 21, 2006 || Kitt Peak || Spacewatch || — || align=right | 1.8 km || 
|-id=010 bgcolor=#fefefe
| 333010 ||  || — || June 20, 2007 || Kitt Peak || Spacewatch || — || align=right | 1.3 km || 
|-id=011 bgcolor=#E9E9E9
| 333011 ||  || — || September 12, 2007 || Catalina || CSS || — || align=right | 1.5 km || 
|-id=012 bgcolor=#E9E9E9
| 333012 ||  || — || March 17, 2005 || Kitt Peak || Spacewatch || DOR || align=right | 2.7 km || 
|-id=013 bgcolor=#d6d6d6
| 333013 ||  || — || March 14, 2004 || Kitt Peak || Spacewatch || EOS || align=right | 2.2 km || 
|-id=014 bgcolor=#E9E9E9
| 333014 ||  || — || September 22, 2003 || Kitt Peak || Spacewatch || — || align=right data-sort-value="0.65" | 650 m || 
|-id=015 bgcolor=#E9E9E9
| 333015 ||  || — || September 15, 2007 || Catalina || CSS || KAZ || align=right | 1.3 km || 
|-id=016 bgcolor=#E9E9E9
| 333016 ||  || — || September 19, 2007 || Kitt Peak || Spacewatch || — || align=right | 1.3 km || 
|-id=017 bgcolor=#E9E9E9
| 333017 ||  || — || March 11, 1997 || Socorro || LINEAR || JUN || align=right | 1.4 km || 
|-id=018 bgcolor=#fefefe
| 333018 ||  || — || September 14, 2007 || Mount Lemmon || Mount Lemmon Survey || NYS || align=right data-sort-value="0.78" | 780 m || 
|-id=019 bgcolor=#fefefe
| 333019 ||  || — || October 14, 2004 || Kitt Peak || Spacewatch || — || align=right | 1.2 km || 
|-id=020 bgcolor=#E9E9E9
| 333020 ||  || — || October 22, 2003 || Kitt Peak || Spacewatch || — || align=right | 1.7 km || 
|-id=021 bgcolor=#E9E9E9
| 333021 ||  || — || February 16, 2001 || Kitt Peak || Spacewatch || ADE || align=right | 4.1 km || 
|-id=022 bgcolor=#E9E9E9
| 333022 ||  || — || February 4, 2005 || Kitt Peak || Spacewatch || — || align=right | 1.7 km || 
|-id=023 bgcolor=#fefefe
| 333023 ||  || — || June 25, 2007 || Kitt Peak || Spacewatch || NYS || align=right data-sort-value="0.76" | 760 m || 
|-id=024 bgcolor=#fefefe
| 333024 ||  || — || August 23, 2007 || Dauban || F. Kugel || — || align=right | 1.00 km || 
|-id=025 bgcolor=#E9E9E9
| 333025 ||  || — || September 22, 2003 || Kitt Peak || Spacewatch || — || align=right | 2.0 km || 
|-id=026 bgcolor=#E9E9E9
| 333026 ||  || — || October 4, 1999 || Kitt Peak || Spacewatch || — || align=right data-sort-value="0.71" | 710 m || 
|-id=027 bgcolor=#E9E9E9
| 333027 ||  || — || October 11, 1977 || Palomar || PLS || JUN || align=right | 1.6 km || 
|-id=028 bgcolor=#fefefe
| 333028 ||  || — || December 3, 2005 || Mauna Kea || A. Boattini || MAS || align=right data-sort-value="0.94" | 940 m || 
|-id=029 bgcolor=#fefefe
| 333029 ||  || — || July 18, 2007 || Mount Lemmon || Mount Lemmon Survey || — || align=right | 2.0 km || 
|-id=030 bgcolor=#fefefe
| 333030 ||  || — || August 10, 2007 || Kitt Peak || Spacewatch || MAS || align=right data-sort-value="0.82" | 820 m || 
|-id=031 bgcolor=#E9E9E9
| 333031 ||  || — || January 27, 2010 || WISE || WISE || ADE || align=right | 3.7 km || 
|-id=032 bgcolor=#E9E9E9
| 333032 ||  || — || October 3, 2003 || Kitt Peak || Spacewatch || — || align=right | 1.2 km || 
|-id=033 bgcolor=#fefefe
| 333033 ||  || — || September 15, 2007 || Mount Lemmon || Mount Lemmon Survey || NYS || align=right data-sort-value="0.79" | 790 m || 
|-id=034 bgcolor=#E9E9E9
| 333034 ||  || — || October 10, 2007 || Kitt Peak || Spacewatch || — || align=right | 1.2 km || 
|-id=035 bgcolor=#E9E9E9
| 333035 ||  || — || October 31, 2007 || Mount Lemmon || Mount Lemmon Survey || — || align=right | 1.6 km || 
|-id=036 bgcolor=#fefefe
| 333036 ||  || — || September 13, 2007 || Mount Lemmon || Mount Lemmon Survey || SUL || align=right | 2.3 km || 
|-id=037 bgcolor=#fefefe
| 333037 ||  || — || September 3, 2007 || Catalina || CSS || V || align=right data-sort-value="0.89" | 890 m || 
|-id=038 bgcolor=#fefefe
| 333038 ||  || — || January 16, 2005 || Kitt Peak || Spacewatch || — || align=right data-sort-value="0.90" | 900 m || 
|-id=039 bgcolor=#fefefe
| 333039 ||  || — || February 25, 2006 || Kitt Peak || Spacewatch || NYS || align=right | 1.0 km || 
|-id=040 bgcolor=#fefefe
| 333040 ||  || — || May 24, 2006 || Mount Lemmon || Mount Lemmon Survey || — || align=right | 1.0 km || 
|-id=041 bgcolor=#E9E9E9
| 333041 ||  || — || October 9, 1999 || Kitt Peak || Spacewatch || — || align=right data-sort-value="0.82" | 820 m || 
|-id=042 bgcolor=#fefefe
| 333042 ||  || — || September 3, 2007 || Catalina || CSS || NYS || align=right data-sort-value="0.96" | 960 m || 
|-id=043 bgcolor=#fefefe
| 333043 ||  || — || December 20, 2004 || Mount Lemmon || Mount Lemmon Survey || MAS || align=right data-sort-value="0.61" | 610 m || 
|-id=044 bgcolor=#E9E9E9
| 333044 ||  || — || May 20, 2006 || Kitt Peak || Spacewatch || — || align=right | 1.1 km || 
|-id=045 bgcolor=#fefefe
| 333045 ||  || — || August 10, 2007 || Kitt Peak || Spacewatch || — || align=right | 1.0 km || 
|-id=046 bgcolor=#E9E9E9
| 333046 ||  || — || March 21, 2002 || Kitt Peak || Spacewatch || — || align=right | 1.2 km || 
|-id=047 bgcolor=#fefefe
| 333047 ||  || — || January 18, 2005 || Catalina || CSS || — || align=right data-sort-value="0.80" | 800 m || 
|-id=048 bgcolor=#E9E9E9
| 333048 ||  || — || December 28, 2003 || Socorro || LINEAR || — || align=right | 2.0 km || 
|-id=049 bgcolor=#fefefe
| 333049 ||  || — || April 26, 2003 || Kitt Peak || Spacewatch || NYS || align=right data-sort-value="0.79" | 790 m || 
|-id=050 bgcolor=#E9E9E9
| 333050 ||  || — || March 11, 2005 || Mount Lemmon || Mount Lemmon Survey || AER || align=right | 1.2 km || 
|-id=051 bgcolor=#E9E9E9
| 333051 ||  || — || April 9, 1996 || Kitt Peak || Spacewatch || — || align=right | 1.4 km || 
|-id=052 bgcolor=#E9E9E9
| 333052 ||  || — || October 20, 2007 || Mount Lemmon || Mount Lemmon Survey || — || align=right | 2.2 km || 
|-id=053 bgcolor=#E9E9E9
| 333053 ||  || — || October 11, 2007 || Kitt Peak || Spacewatch || — || align=right | 1.3 km || 
|-id=054 bgcolor=#E9E9E9
| 333054 ||  || — || May 6, 2006 || Mount Lemmon || Mount Lemmon Survey || — || align=right | 1.4 km || 
|-id=055 bgcolor=#E9E9E9
| 333055 ||  || — || September 15, 2007 || Mount Lemmon || Mount Lemmon Survey || — || align=right | 1.2 km || 
|-id=056 bgcolor=#E9E9E9
| 333056 ||  || — || October 16, 2007 || Mount Lemmon || Mount Lemmon Survey || — || align=right | 2.8 km || 
|-id=057 bgcolor=#E9E9E9
| 333057 ||  || — || September 12, 2007 || Mount Lemmon || Mount Lemmon Survey || EUN || align=right | 1.3 km || 
|-id=058 bgcolor=#E9E9E9
| 333058 ||  || — || February 12, 2004 || Kitt Peak || Spacewatch || AGN || align=right | 1.5 km || 
|-id=059 bgcolor=#fefefe
| 333059 ||  || — || February 25, 2006 || Mount Lemmon || Mount Lemmon Survey || MAS || align=right data-sort-value="0.75" | 750 m || 
|-id=060 bgcolor=#E9E9E9
| 333060 || 2011 TF || — || March 19, 2001 || Anderson Mesa || LONEOS || — || align=right | 1.9 km || 
|-id=061 bgcolor=#fefefe
| 333061 ||  || — || December 19, 2004 || Mount Lemmon || Mount Lemmon Survey || NYS || align=right data-sort-value="0.72" | 720 m || 
|-id=062 bgcolor=#fefefe
| 333062 ||  || — || April 19, 2006 || Kitt Peak || Spacewatch || — || align=right | 2.7 km || 
|-id=063 bgcolor=#E9E9E9
| 333063 ||  || — || September 17, 2006 || Kitt Peak || Spacewatch || — || align=right | 3.1 km || 
|-id=064 bgcolor=#fefefe
| 333064 ||  || — || September 12, 2007 || Catalina || CSS || — || align=right | 2.7 km || 
|-id=065 bgcolor=#fefefe
| 333065 ||  || — || September 13, 2007 || Mount Lemmon || Mount Lemmon Survey || NYS || align=right data-sort-value="0.77" | 770 m || 
|-id=066 bgcolor=#fefefe
| 333066 ||  || — || September 19, 2007 || Dauban || F. Kugel || — || align=right | 1.3 km || 
|-id=067 bgcolor=#fefefe
| 333067 ||  || — || January 26, 2001 || Kitt Peak || Spacewatch || MAS || align=right data-sort-value="0.69" | 690 m || 
|-id=068 bgcolor=#fefefe
| 333068 ||  || — || September 18, 2003 || Kitt Peak || Spacewatch || — || align=right data-sort-value="0.78" | 780 m || 
|-id=069 bgcolor=#fefefe
| 333069 ||  || — || October 7, 2005 || Mauna Kea || A. Boattini || — || align=right data-sort-value="0.98" | 980 m || 
|-id=070 bgcolor=#E9E9E9
| 333070 ||  || — || October 15, 2007 || Kitt Peak || Spacewatch || — || align=right | 1.2 km || 
|-id=071 bgcolor=#fefefe
| 333071 ||  || — || October 19, 2003 || Kitt Peak || Spacewatch || — || align=right data-sort-value="0.94" | 940 m || 
|-id=072 bgcolor=#fefefe
| 333072 ||  || — || January 1, 2009 || Kitt Peak || Spacewatch || — || align=right data-sort-value="0.94" | 940 m || 
|-id=073 bgcolor=#E9E9E9
| 333073 ||  || — || October 31, 1999 || Kitt Peak || Spacewatch || — || align=right data-sort-value="0.87" | 870 m || 
|-id=074 bgcolor=#E9E9E9
| 333074 ||  || — || September 18, 2007 || Kitt Peak || Spacewatch || — || align=right data-sort-value="0.83" | 830 m || 
|-id=075 bgcolor=#fefefe
| 333075 ||  || — || October 8, 2004 || Kitt Peak || Spacewatch || — || align=right | 1.4 km || 
|-id=076 bgcolor=#E9E9E9
| 333076 ||  || — || October 16, 2007 || Mount Lemmon || Mount Lemmon Survey || — || align=right | 1.2 km || 
|-id=077 bgcolor=#fefefe
| 333077 ||  || — || September 20, 2003 || Palomar || NEAT || — || align=right | 2.8 km || 
|-id=078 bgcolor=#d6d6d6
| 333078 ||  || — || August 28, 2005 || Anderson Mesa || LONEOS || — || align=right | 5.2 km || 
|-id=079 bgcolor=#E9E9E9
| 333079 ||  || — || October 20, 2007 || Mount Lemmon || Mount Lemmon Survey || — || align=right data-sort-value="0.96" | 960 m || 
|-id=080 bgcolor=#fefefe
| 333080 ||  || — || October 2, 1992 || Kitt Peak || Spacewatch || MAScritical || align=right data-sort-value="0.65" | 650 m || 
|-id=081 bgcolor=#fefefe
| 333081 ||  || — || September 13, 2007 || Mount Lemmon || Mount Lemmon Survey || NYS || align=right data-sort-value="0.79" | 790 m || 
|-id=082 bgcolor=#fefefe
| 333082 ||  || — || January 13, 2005 || Catalina || CSS || — || align=right | 1.1 km || 
|-id=083 bgcolor=#fefefe
| 333083 ||  || — || May 6, 2006 || Kitt Peak || Spacewatch || V || align=right data-sort-value="0.76" | 760 m || 
|-id=084 bgcolor=#fefefe
| 333084 ||  || — || April 29, 2003 || Socorro || LINEAR || FLO || align=right data-sort-value="0.91" | 910 m || 
|-id=085 bgcolor=#E9E9E9
| 333085 ||  || — || September 18, 2003 || Kitt Peak || Spacewatch || — || align=right data-sort-value="0.86" | 860 m || 
|-id=086 bgcolor=#fefefe
| 333086 ||  || — || September 11, 2007 || Kitt Peak || Spacewatch || — || align=right data-sort-value="0.66" | 660 m || 
|-id=087 bgcolor=#fefefe
| 333087 ||  || — || February 24, 2006 || Kitt Peak || Spacewatch || V || align=right data-sort-value="0.85" | 850 m || 
|-id=088 bgcolor=#fefefe
| 333088 ||  || — || January 17, 2005 || Kitt Peak || Spacewatch || MAS || align=right data-sort-value="0.71" | 710 m || 
|-id=089 bgcolor=#fefefe
| 333089 ||  || — || January 7, 2006 || Mount Lemmon || Mount Lemmon Survey || FLO || align=right data-sort-value="0.77" | 770 m || 
|-id=090 bgcolor=#d6d6d6
| 333090 ||  || — || November 17, 2006 || Kitt Peak || Spacewatch || LIX || align=right | 5.3 km || 
|-id=091 bgcolor=#E9E9E9
| 333091 ||  || — || September 19, 1998 || Apache Point || SDSS || — || align=right | 1.4 km || 
|-id=092 bgcolor=#fefefe
| 333092 ||  || — || February 20, 2006 || Kitt Peak || Spacewatch || MAS || align=right data-sort-value="0.89" | 890 m || 
|-id=093 bgcolor=#fefefe
| 333093 ||  || — || November 17, 1993 || Kitt Peak || Spacewatch || NYS || align=right data-sort-value="0.89" | 890 m || 
|-id=094 bgcolor=#fefefe
| 333094 ||  || — || February 22, 2006 || Kitt Peak || Spacewatch || FLO || align=right data-sort-value="0.76" | 760 m || 
|-id=095 bgcolor=#fefefe
| 333095 ||  || — || March 11, 2002 || Palomar || NEAT || V || align=right data-sort-value="0.99" | 990 m || 
|-id=096 bgcolor=#fefefe
| 333096 ||  || — || September 13, 2007 || Mount Lemmon || Mount Lemmon Survey || NYS || align=right data-sort-value="0.71" | 710 m || 
|-id=097 bgcolor=#fefefe
| 333097 ||  || — || March 8, 2005 || Mount Lemmon || Mount Lemmon Survey || MAS || align=right data-sort-value="0.66" | 660 m || 
|-id=098 bgcolor=#fefefe
| 333098 ||  || — || December 11, 2004 || Kitt Peak || Spacewatch || — || align=right data-sort-value="0.89" | 890 m || 
|-id=099 bgcolor=#E9E9E9
| 333099 ||  || — || February 17, 2004 || Kitt Peak || Spacewatch || AGN || align=right | 1.4 km || 
|-id=100 bgcolor=#fefefe
| 333100 ||  || — || January 13, 2005 || Kitt Peak || Spacewatch || NYS || align=right data-sort-value="0.68" | 680 m || 
|}

333101–333200 

|-bgcolor=#E9E9E9
| 333101 ||  || — || September 14, 2007 || Mount Lemmon || Mount Lemmon Survey || — || align=right data-sort-value="0.83" | 830 m || 
|-id=102 bgcolor=#fefefe
| 333102 ||  || — || September 8, 2004 || Palomar || NEAT || FLO || align=right data-sort-value="0.82" | 820 m || 
|-id=103 bgcolor=#fefefe
| 333103 ||  || — || December 23, 2000 || Apache Point || SDSS || — || align=right | 1.0 km || 
|-id=104 bgcolor=#fefefe
| 333104 ||  || — || August 24, 2000 || Socorro || LINEAR || V || align=right data-sort-value="0.73" | 730 m || 
|-id=105 bgcolor=#E9E9E9
| 333105 ||  || — || October 22, 2003 || Kitt Peak || Spacewatch || — || align=right data-sort-value="0.74" | 740 m || 
|-id=106 bgcolor=#fefefe
| 333106 ||  || — || December 20, 2004 || Mount Lemmon || Mount Lemmon Survey || NYS || align=right data-sort-value="0.57" | 570 m || 
|-id=107 bgcolor=#fefefe
| 333107 ||  || — || September 12, 2007 || Mount Lemmon || Mount Lemmon Survey || — || align=right | 1.4 km || 
|-id=108 bgcolor=#E9E9E9
| 333108 ||  || — || January 4, 2000 || Kitt Peak || Spacewatch || — || align=right data-sort-value="0.94" | 940 m || 
|-id=109 bgcolor=#E9E9E9
| 333109 ||  || — || September 13, 2002 || Palomar || NEAT || HEN || align=right | 1.1 km || 
|-id=110 bgcolor=#fefefe
| 333110 ||  || — || September 2, 2007 || Mount Lemmon || Mount Lemmon Survey || — || align=right | 1.2 km || 
|-id=111 bgcolor=#d6d6d6
| 333111 ||  || — || February 21, 2003 || Palomar || NEAT || — || align=right | 3.7 km || 
|-id=112 bgcolor=#E9E9E9
| 333112 ||  || — || October 23, 2003 || Apache Point || SDSS || — || align=right | 1.4 km || 
|-id=113 bgcolor=#fefefe
| 333113 ||  || — || April 5, 2003 || Kitt Peak || Spacewatch || — || align=right | 2.1 km || 
|-id=114 bgcolor=#fefefe
| 333114 ||  || — || September 12, 2007 || Catalina || CSS || — || align=right | 1.2 km || 
|-id=115 bgcolor=#fefefe
| 333115 ||  || — || July 26, 2001 || Palomar || NEAT || — || align=right data-sort-value="0.94" | 940 m || 
|-id=116 bgcolor=#fefefe
| 333116 ||  || — || April 19, 1993 || Kitt Peak || Spacewatch || — || align=right | 1.1 km || 
|-id=117 bgcolor=#fefefe
| 333117 ||  || — || January 1, 2001 || Kitt Peak || Spacewatch || — || align=right data-sort-value="0.93" | 930 m || 
|-id=118 bgcolor=#fefefe
| 333118 ||  || — || August 1, 2001 || Palomar || NEAT || — || align=right | 1.00 km || 
|-id=119 bgcolor=#fefefe
| 333119 ||  || — || March 25, 2006 || Mount Lemmon || Mount Lemmon Survey || MAS || align=right data-sort-value="0.78" | 780 m || 
|-id=120 bgcolor=#fefefe
| 333120 ||  || — || September 11, 2007 || Mount Lemmon || Mount Lemmon Survey || — || align=right data-sort-value="0.77" | 770 m || 
|-id=121 bgcolor=#d6d6d6
| 333121 ||  || — || April 11, 2003 || Kitt Peak || Spacewatch || HYG || align=right | 3.2 km || 
|-id=122 bgcolor=#fefefe
| 333122 ||  || — || November 28, 2000 || Kitt Peak || Spacewatch || MAS || align=right data-sort-value="0.61" | 610 m || 
|-id=123 bgcolor=#fefefe
| 333123 ||  || — || April 26, 2006 || Kitt Peak || Spacewatch || — || align=right | 1.0 km || 
|-id=124 bgcolor=#E9E9E9
| 333124 ||  || — || December 29, 2003 || Anderson Mesa || LONEOS || MAR || align=right | 3.5 km || 
|-id=125 bgcolor=#E9E9E9
| 333125 ||  || — || October 10, 2007 || Mount Lemmon || Mount Lemmon Survey || — || align=right data-sort-value="0.78" | 780 m || 
|-id=126 bgcolor=#d6d6d6
| 333126 ||  || — || September 22, 2004 || Kitt Peak || Spacewatch || 7:4 || align=right | 3.3 km || 
|-id=127 bgcolor=#d6d6d6
| 333127 ||  || — || October 23, 2005 || Kitt Peak || Spacewatch || EOS || align=right | 3.0 km || 
|-id=128 bgcolor=#fefefe
| 333128 ||  || — || April 2, 2006 || Kitt Peak || Spacewatch || — || align=right | 1.0 km || 
|-id=129 bgcolor=#fefefe
| 333129 ||  || — || January 13, 2005 || Kitt Peak || Spacewatch || NYS || align=right data-sort-value="0.57" | 570 m || 
|-id=130 bgcolor=#E9E9E9
| 333130 ||  || — || December 18, 2003 || Kitt Peak || Spacewatch || MAR || align=right | 1.5 km || 
|-id=131 bgcolor=#E9E9E9
| 333131 ||  || — || March 27, 2000 || Kitt Peak || Spacewatch || — || align=right | 1.8 km || 
|-id=132 bgcolor=#fefefe
| 333132 ||  || — || December 18, 2004 || Mount Lemmon || Mount Lemmon Survey || MAS || align=right data-sort-value="0.61" | 610 m || 
|-id=133 bgcolor=#fefefe
| 333133 ||  || — || December 15, 2004 || Kitt Peak || Spacewatch || — || align=right | 1.00 km || 
|-id=134 bgcolor=#fefefe
| 333134 ||  || — || December 18, 2004 || Mount Lemmon || Mount Lemmon Survey || — || align=right data-sort-value="0.85" | 850 m || 
|-id=135 bgcolor=#fefefe
| 333135 ||  || — || September 10, 2007 || Kitt Peak || Spacewatch || MAS || align=right data-sort-value="0.60" | 600 m || 
|-id=136 bgcolor=#fefefe
| 333136 ||  || — || September 9, 2007 || Kitt Peak || Spacewatch || FLO || align=right data-sort-value="0.79" | 790 m || 
|-id=137 bgcolor=#fefefe
| 333137 ||  || — || September 18, 2003 || Kitt Peak || Spacewatch || NYS || align=right data-sort-value="0.64" | 640 m || 
|-id=138 bgcolor=#fefefe
| 333138 ||  || — || October 15, 2007 || Catalina || CSS || — || align=right | 1.2 km || 
|-id=139 bgcolor=#fefefe
| 333139 ||  || — || September 11, 2007 || Mount Lemmon || Mount Lemmon Survey || — || align=right data-sort-value="0.82" | 820 m || 
|-id=140 bgcolor=#fefefe
| 333140 ||  || — || April 20, 2006 || Anderson Mesa || LONEOS || FLO || align=right | 1.7 km || 
|-id=141 bgcolor=#fefefe
| 333141 ||  || — || December 2, 2004 || Kitt Peak || Spacewatch || — || align=right data-sort-value="0.89" | 890 m || 
|-id=142 bgcolor=#fefefe
| 333142 ||  || — || October 16, 2007 || Mount Lemmon || Mount Lemmon Survey || — || align=right data-sort-value="0.87" | 870 m || 
|-id=143 bgcolor=#fefefe
| 333143 ||  || — || December 3, 2004 || Kitt Peak || Spacewatch || FLO || align=right data-sort-value="0.67" | 670 m || 
|-id=144 bgcolor=#fefefe
| 333144 ||  || — || August 31, 2000 || Kitt Peak || Spacewatch || — || align=right | 1.1 km || 
|-id=145 bgcolor=#fefefe
| 333145 ||  || — || January 31, 2006 || Mount Lemmon || Mount Lemmon Survey || FLO || align=right data-sort-value="0.77" | 770 m || 
|-id=146 bgcolor=#fefefe
| 333146 ||  || — || December 20, 2004 || Mount Lemmon || Mount Lemmon Survey || — || align=right data-sort-value="0.72" | 720 m || 
|-id=147 bgcolor=#E9E9E9
| 333147 ||  || — || October 6, 2002 || Palomar || NEAT || — || align=right | 4.3 km || 
|-id=148 bgcolor=#d6d6d6
| 333148 ||  || — || August 22, 2004 || Siding Spring || SSS || — || align=right | 3.4 km || 
|-id=149 bgcolor=#E9E9E9
| 333149 ||  || — || February 7, 2003 || Palomar || NEAT || — || align=right | 2.5 km || 
|-id=150 bgcolor=#fefefe
| 333150 ||  || — || February 2, 2005 || Kitt Peak || Spacewatch || — || align=right data-sort-value="0.79" | 790 m || 
|-id=151 bgcolor=#d6d6d6
| 333151 ||  || — || August 17, 2009 || Kitt Peak || Spacewatch || — || align=right | 3.7 km || 
|-id=152 bgcolor=#fefefe
| 333152 ||  || — || October 6, 1996 || Prescott || P. G. Comba || — || align=right data-sort-value="0.80" | 800 m || 
|-id=153 bgcolor=#fefefe
| 333153 ||  || — || February 13, 2002 || Apache Point || SDSS || — || align=right data-sort-value="0.72" | 720 m || 
|-id=154 bgcolor=#d6d6d6
| 333154 ||  || — || January 31, 2006 || Kitt Peak || Spacewatch || HYG || align=right | 3.1 km || 
|-id=155 bgcolor=#fefefe
| 333155 ||  || — || September 30, 2003 || Kitt Peak || Spacewatch || — || align=right data-sort-value="0.71" | 710 m || 
|-id=156 bgcolor=#fefefe
| 333156 ||  || — || February 16, 2002 || Palomar || NEAT || — || align=right data-sort-value="0.86" | 860 m || 
|-id=157 bgcolor=#fefefe
| 333157 ||  || — || September 10, 2007 || Mount Lemmon || Mount Lemmon Survey || — || align=right data-sort-value="0.85" | 850 m || 
|-id=158 bgcolor=#E9E9E9
| 333158 ||  || — || February 9, 2008 || Kitt Peak || Spacewatch || AGN || align=right | 1.5 km || 
|-id=159 bgcolor=#fefefe
| 333159 ||  || — || February 1, 2005 || Kitt Peak || Spacewatch || — || align=right data-sort-value="0.68" | 680 m || 
|-id=160 bgcolor=#fefefe
| 333160 ||  || — || December 9, 2004 || Kitt Peak || Spacewatch || — || align=right data-sort-value="0.92" | 920 m || 
|-id=161 bgcolor=#fefefe
| 333161 ||  || — || January 17, 2005 || Kitt Peak || Spacewatch || — || align=right data-sort-value="0.64" | 640 m || 
|-id=162 bgcolor=#fefefe
| 333162 ||  || — || June 24, 2006 || Reedy Creek || J. Broughton || — || align=right | 1.5 km || 
|-id=163 bgcolor=#fefefe
| 333163 ||  || — || March 10, 2002 || Kitt Peak || Spacewatch || — || align=right data-sort-value="0.62" | 620 m || 
|-id=164 bgcolor=#fefefe
| 333164 ||  || — || April 19, 2006 || Kitt Peak || Spacewatch || — || align=right data-sort-value="0.65" | 650 m || 
|-id=165 bgcolor=#fefefe
| 333165 ||  || — || December 3, 2004 || Kitt Peak || Spacewatch || — || align=right data-sort-value="0.72" | 720 m || 
|-id=166 bgcolor=#d6d6d6
| 333166 ||  || — || January 23, 2006 || Mount Lemmon || Mount Lemmon Survey || — || align=right | 6.3 km || 
|-id=167 bgcolor=#d6d6d6
| 333167 ||  || — || September 11, 2004 || Kitt Peak || Spacewatch || EOS || align=right | 2.6 km || 
|-id=168 bgcolor=#d6d6d6
| 333168 ||  || — || August 30, 2002 || Palomar || NEAT || SYL7:4 || align=right | 4.7 km || 
|-id=169 bgcolor=#fefefe
| 333169 ||  || — || October 10, 2004 || Kitt Peak || Spacewatch || — || align=right data-sort-value="0.55" | 550 m || 
|-id=170 bgcolor=#d6d6d6
| 333170 ||  || — || October 20, 2003 || Kitt Peak || Spacewatch || EUP || align=right | 3.8 km || 
|-id=171 bgcolor=#d6d6d6
| 333171 ||  || — || April 11, 2005 || Mount Lemmon || Mount Lemmon Survey || SHU3:2 || align=right | 6.3 km || 
|-id=172 bgcolor=#d6d6d6
| 333172 ||  || — || December 24, 2006 || Mount Lemmon || Mount Lemmon Survey || — || align=right | 3.3 km || 
|-id=173 bgcolor=#d6d6d6
| 333173 ||  || — || March 22, 2002 || Eskridge || G. Hug || — || align=right | 5.1 km || 
|-id=174 bgcolor=#d6d6d6
| 333174 ||  || — || December 12, 1999 || Socorro || LINEAR || EOS || align=right | 2.9 km || 
|-id=175 bgcolor=#d6d6d6
| 333175 ||  || — || January 22, 2006 || Catalina || CSS || Tj (2.91) || align=right | 4.1 km || 
|-id=176 bgcolor=#E9E9E9
| 333176 ||  || — || February 25, 2007 || Mount Lemmon || Mount Lemmon Survey || AGN || align=right | 1.7 km || 
|-id=177 bgcolor=#fefefe
| 333177 ||  || — || November 30, 2003 || Kitt Peak || Spacewatch || — || align=right | 1.1 km || 
|-id=178 bgcolor=#d6d6d6
| 333178 ||  || — || December 25, 2005 || Mount Lemmon || Mount Lemmon Survey || — || align=right | 2.9 km || 
|-id=179 bgcolor=#fefefe
| 333179 ||  || — || October 9, 2007 || Kitt Peak || Spacewatch || — || align=right data-sort-value="0.55" | 550 m || 
|-id=180 bgcolor=#fefefe
| 333180 ||  || — || November 5, 1994 || Kitt Peak || Spacewatch || V || align=right data-sort-value="0.91" | 910 m || 
|-id=181 bgcolor=#d6d6d6
| 333181 ||  || — || March 12, 2007 || Kitt Peak || Spacewatch || — || align=right | 3.4 km || 
|-id=182 bgcolor=#E9E9E9
| 333182 ||  || — || September 20, 1995 || Kitt Peak || Spacewatch || MRX || align=right | 1.2 km || 
|-id=183 bgcolor=#fefefe
| 333183 ||  || — || October 9, 2007 || Mount Lemmon || Mount Lemmon Survey || — || align=right | 1.3 km || 
|-id=184 bgcolor=#E9E9E9
| 333184 ||  || — || July 11, 2005 || Mount Lemmon || Mount Lemmon Survey || — || align=right | 1.0 km || 
|-id=185 bgcolor=#d6d6d6
| 333185 ||  || — || January 10, 2006 || Kitt Peak || Spacewatch || HYG || align=right | 3.0 km || 
|-id=186 bgcolor=#fefefe
| 333186 ||  || — || September 18, 2003 || Kitt Peak || Spacewatch || — || align=right data-sort-value="0.68" | 680 m || 
|-id=187 bgcolor=#d6d6d6
| 333187 ||  || — || December 25, 2005 || Kitt Peak || Spacewatch || — || align=right | 3.3 km || 
|-id=188 bgcolor=#fefefe
| 333188 ||  || — || February 8, 2008 || Kitt Peak || Spacewatch || — || align=right data-sort-value="0.74" | 740 m || 
|-id=189 bgcolor=#E9E9E9
| 333189 ||  || — || September 4, 2000 || Anderson Mesa || LONEOS || — || align=right | 3.3 km || 
|-id=190 bgcolor=#d6d6d6
| 333190 ||  || — || February 21, 2006 || Catalina || CSS || — || align=right | 4.6 km || 
|-id=191 bgcolor=#E9E9E9
| 333191 ||  || — || October 24, 2005 || Kitt Peak || Spacewatch || — || align=right | 1.7 km || 
|-id=192 bgcolor=#fefefe
| 333192 ||  || — || April 9, 2008 || Kitt Peak || Spacewatch || NYS || align=right data-sort-value="0.81" | 810 m || 
|-id=193 bgcolor=#fefefe
| 333193 ||  || — || September 21, 2003 || Kitt Peak || Spacewatch || — || align=right data-sort-value="0.79" | 790 m || 
|-id=194 bgcolor=#E9E9E9
| 333194 ||  || — || October 1, 2005 || Kitt Peak || Spacewatch || — || align=right | 2.1 km || 
|-id=195 bgcolor=#fefefe
| 333195 ||  || — || March 15, 2005 || Mount Lemmon || Mount Lemmon Survey || NYS || align=right data-sort-value="0.70" | 700 m || 
|-id=196 bgcolor=#d6d6d6
| 333196 ||  || — || February 24, 2006 || Palomar || NEAT || MEL || align=right | 4.4 km || 
|-id=197 bgcolor=#E9E9E9
| 333197 ||  || — || March 24, 2003 || Kitt Peak || Spacewatch || — || align=right | 1.6 km || 
|-id=198 bgcolor=#fefefe
| 333198 ||  || — || November 11, 2006 || Kitt Peak || Spacewatch || V || align=right data-sort-value="0.83" | 830 m || 
|-id=199 bgcolor=#E9E9E9
| 333199 ||  || — || December 24, 2006 || Kitt Peak || Spacewatch || — || align=right | 1.5 km || 
|-id=200 bgcolor=#d6d6d6
| 333200 ||  || — || October 23, 2003 || Apache Point || SDSS || — || align=right | 3.3 km || 
|}

333201–333300 

|-bgcolor=#d6d6d6
| 333201 ||  || — || November 24, 2003 || Kitt Peak || Spacewatch || — || align=right | 4.6 km || 
|-id=202 bgcolor=#d6d6d6
| 333202 ||  || — || April 19, 2006 || Palomar || NEAT || — || align=right | 3.5 km || 
|-id=203 bgcolor=#E9E9E9
| 333203 ||  || — || March 12, 2003 || Palomar || NEAT || — || align=right | 2.3 km || 
|-id=204 bgcolor=#E9E9E9
| 333204 ||  || — || November 23, 2006 || Kitt Peak || Spacewatch || — || align=right | 1.2 km || 
|-id=205 bgcolor=#fefefe
| 333205 ||  || — || February 13, 2009 || Catalina || CSS || H || align=right | 1.0 km || 
|-id=206 bgcolor=#fefefe
| 333206 ||  || — || December 22, 2005 || Socorro || LINEAR || H || align=right data-sort-value="0.73" | 730 m || 
|-id=207 bgcolor=#fefefe
| 333207 ||  || — || May 8, 2005 || Mount Lemmon || Mount Lemmon Survey || NYS || align=right data-sort-value="0.58" | 580 m || 
|-id=208 bgcolor=#E9E9E9
| 333208 ||  || — || August 9, 2004 || Siding Spring || SSS || JUN || align=right | 1.0 km || 
|-id=209 bgcolor=#E9E9E9
| 333209 ||  || — || January 20, 2007 || Antares || ARO || MAR || align=right | 1.4 km || 
|-id=210 bgcolor=#d6d6d6
| 333210 ||  || — || January 5, 2006 || Catalina || CSS || EMA || align=right | 4.9 km || 
|-id=211 bgcolor=#d6d6d6
| 333211 ||  || — || October 9, 2004 || Kitt Peak || Spacewatch || TEL || align=right | 1.5 km || 
|-id=212 bgcolor=#fefefe
| 333212 ||  || — || February 2, 2008 || Kitt Peak || Spacewatch || — || align=right data-sort-value="0.86" | 860 m || 
|-id=213 bgcolor=#d6d6d6
| 333213 ||  || — || June 29, 2008 || Siding Spring || SSS || — || align=right | 3.5 km || 
|-id=214 bgcolor=#E9E9E9
| 333214 ||  || — || February 23, 2007 || Kitt Peak || Spacewatch || — || align=right | 1.8 km || 
|-id=215 bgcolor=#fefefe
| 333215 ||  || — || June 10, 2004 || Socorro || LINEAR || H || align=right data-sort-value="0.66" | 660 m || 
|-id=216 bgcolor=#d6d6d6
| 333216 ||  || — || February 16, 2001 || Socorro || LINEAR || — || align=right | 4.2 km || 
|-id=217 bgcolor=#E9E9E9
| 333217 ||  || — || March 27, 2003 || Palomar || NEAT || MAR || align=right | 1.6 km || 
|-id=218 bgcolor=#d6d6d6
| 333218 ||  || — || November 18, 2003 || Kitt Peak || Spacewatch || — || align=right | 3.9 km || 
|-id=219 bgcolor=#d6d6d6
| 333219 ||  || — || March 15, 2007 || Mount Lemmon || Mount Lemmon Survey || TRE || align=right | 3.6 km || 
|-id=220 bgcolor=#fefefe
| 333220 ||  || — || July 29, 2005 || Siding Spring || SSS || NYS || align=right data-sort-value="0.69" | 690 m || 
|-id=221 bgcolor=#fefefe
| 333221 ||  || — || December 11, 2004 || Kitt Peak || Spacewatch || — || align=right data-sort-value="0.99" | 990 m || 
|-id=222 bgcolor=#d6d6d6
| 333222 ||  || — || September 27, 2003 || Apache Point || SDSS || — || align=right | 3.8 km || 
|-id=223 bgcolor=#E9E9E9
| 333223 ||  || — || October 25, 2001 || Apache Point || SDSS || — || align=right | 1.6 km || 
|-id=224 bgcolor=#fefefe
| 333224 ||  || — || March 11, 2005 || Catalina || CSS || — || align=right data-sort-value="0.94" | 940 m || 
|-id=225 bgcolor=#E9E9E9
| 333225 ||  || — || April 4, 1995 || Kitt Peak || Spacewatch || — || align=right | 2.0 km || 
|-id=226 bgcolor=#d6d6d6
| 333226 ||  || — || November 4, 2004 || Kitt Peak || Spacewatch || — || align=right | 3.9 km || 
|-id=227 bgcolor=#d6d6d6
| 333227 ||  || — || May 29, 2001 || Haleakala || NEAT || HYG || align=right | 4.2 km || 
|-id=228 bgcolor=#d6d6d6
| 333228 ||  || — || December 10, 2009 || Mount Lemmon || Mount Lemmon Survey || — || align=right | 3.8 km || 
|-id=229 bgcolor=#E9E9E9
| 333229 ||  || — || October 25, 2009 || Kitt Peak || Spacewatch || — || align=right | 2.7 km || 
|-id=230 bgcolor=#E9E9E9
| 333230 ||  || — || October 2, 2009 || Mount Lemmon || Mount Lemmon Survey || — || align=right | 3.1 km || 
|-id=231 bgcolor=#E9E9E9
| 333231 ||  || — || July 30, 2000 || Socorro || LINEAR || — || align=right | 1.5 km || 
|-id=232 bgcolor=#d6d6d6
| 333232 ||  || — || May 11, 2007 || Kitt Peak || Spacewatch || — || align=right | 3.6 km || 
|-id=233 bgcolor=#E9E9E9
| 333233 ||  || — || November 11, 2005 || Catalina || CSS || — || align=right | 2.3 km || 
|-id=234 bgcolor=#E9E9E9
| 333234 ||  || — || February 6, 2007 || Mount Lemmon || Mount Lemmon Survey || — || align=right | 1.3 km || 
|-id=235 bgcolor=#E9E9E9
| 333235 ||  || — || March 9, 2003 || Palomar || NEAT || MAR || align=right | 1.6 km || 
|-id=236 bgcolor=#d6d6d6
| 333236 ||  || — || April 15, 1996 || Kitt Peak || Spacewatch || — || align=right | 4.1 km || 
|-id=237 bgcolor=#E9E9E9
| 333237 ||  || — || March 15, 2007 || Kitt Peak || Spacewatch || — || align=right | 3.0 km || 
|-id=238 bgcolor=#E9E9E9
| 333238 ||  || — || May 2, 2003 || Kitt Peak || Spacewatch || — || align=right | 2.7 km || 
|-id=239 bgcolor=#d6d6d6
| 333239 ||  || — || September 4, 2008 || Kitt Peak || Spacewatch || HYG || align=right | 3.2 km || 
|-id=240 bgcolor=#E9E9E9
| 333240 ||  || — || September 7, 2004 || Socorro || LINEAR || — || align=right | 2.5 km || 
|-id=241 bgcolor=#E9E9E9
| 333241 ||  || — || October 1, 2005 || Mount Lemmon || Mount Lemmon Survey || — || align=right | 2.0 km || 
|-id=242 bgcolor=#fefefe
| 333242 ||  || — || May 8, 2005 || Mount Lemmon || Mount Lemmon Survey || FLO || align=right data-sort-value="0.74" | 740 m || 
|-id=243 bgcolor=#E9E9E9
| 333243 ||  || — || November 13, 2010 || Kitt Peak || Spacewatch || ADE || align=right | 2.3 km || 
|-id=244 bgcolor=#E9E9E9
| 333244 ||  || — || December 13, 2006 || Kitt Peak || Spacewatch || — || align=right | 1.3 km || 
|-id=245 bgcolor=#d6d6d6
| 333245 ||  || — || October 6, 2008 || Mount Lemmon || Mount Lemmon Survey || — || align=right | 4.3 km || 
|-id=246 bgcolor=#E9E9E9
| 333246 ||  || — || February 15, 1994 || Kitt Peak || Spacewatch || — || align=right | 2.1 km || 
|-id=247 bgcolor=#E9E9E9
| 333247 ||  || — || March 11, 2007 || Kitt Peak || Spacewatch || MRX || align=right | 1.4 km || 
|-id=248 bgcolor=#E9E9E9
| 333248 ||  || — || June 22, 2004 || Kitt Peak || Spacewatch || — || align=right | 1.8 km || 
|-id=249 bgcolor=#d6d6d6
| 333249 ||  || — || February 27, 2006 || Kitt Peak || Spacewatch || THM || align=right | 2.4 km || 
|-id=250 bgcolor=#E9E9E9
| 333250 ||  || — || August 22, 1995 || Kitt Peak || Spacewatch || — || align=right | 2.6 km || 
|-id=251 bgcolor=#d6d6d6
| 333251 ||  || — || October 15, 2004 || Mount Lemmon || Mount Lemmon Survey || — || align=right | 3.8 km || 
|-id=252 bgcolor=#E9E9E9
| 333252 ||  || — || December 24, 2006 || Kitt Peak || Spacewatch || — || align=right | 1.2 km || 
|-id=253 bgcolor=#d6d6d6
| 333253 ||  || — || December 19, 2004 || Mount Lemmon || Mount Lemmon Survey || — || align=right | 4.5 km || 
|-id=254 bgcolor=#fefefe
| 333254 ||  || — || November 24, 1998 || Kitt Peak || Spacewatch || — || align=right | 1.0 km || 
|-id=255 bgcolor=#E9E9E9
| 333255 ||  || — || January 28, 2007 || Mount Lemmon || Mount Lemmon Survey || — || align=right | 1.3 km || 
|-id=256 bgcolor=#d6d6d6
| 333256 ||  || — || November 4, 2005 || Kitt Peak || Spacewatch || — || align=right | 3.2 km || 
|-id=257 bgcolor=#d6d6d6
| 333257 ||  || — || October 1, 2003 || Kitt Peak || Spacewatch || EOS || align=right | 2.7 km || 
|-id=258 bgcolor=#d6d6d6
| 333258 ||  || — || January 5, 2000 || Kitt Peak || Spacewatch || — || align=right | 3.3 km || 
|-id=259 bgcolor=#d6d6d6
| 333259 ||  || — || October 6, 2008 || Mount Lemmon || Mount Lemmon Survey || VER || align=right | 3.4 km || 
|-id=260 bgcolor=#fefefe
| 333260 ||  || — || July 20, 2001 || Palomar || NEAT || SVE || align=right | 2.6 km || 
|-id=261 bgcolor=#fefefe
| 333261 ||  || — || November 16, 2006 || Kitt Peak || Spacewatch || — || align=right | 1.1 km || 
|-id=262 bgcolor=#fefefe
| 333262 ||  || — || April 25, 2008 || Kitt Peak || Spacewatch || V || align=right data-sort-value="0.64" | 640 m || 
|-id=263 bgcolor=#fefefe
| 333263 ||  || — || April 21, 2001 || Haleakala || NEAT || H || align=right data-sort-value="0.61" | 610 m || 
|-id=264 bgcolor=#d6d6d6
| 333264 ||  || — || February 27, 2006 || Catalina || CSS || — || align=right | 3.8 km || 
|-id=265 bgcolor=#d6d6d6
| 333265 ||  || — || May 15, 2001 || Anderson Mesa || LONEOS || Tj (2.92) || align=right | 5.0 km || 
|-id=266 bgcolor=#fefefe
| 333266 ||  || — || June 19, 1998 || Kitt Peak || Spacewatch || NYS || align=right data-sort-value="0.65" | 650 m || 
|-id=267 bgcolor=#fefefe
| 333267 ||  || — || September 28, 2006 || Mount Lemmon || Mount Lemmon Survey || — || align=right data-sort-value="0.86" | 860 m || 
|-id=268 bgcolor=#d6d6d6
| 333268 ||  || — || September 28, 2009 || Mount Lemmon || Mount Lemmon Survey || — || align=right | 3.6 km || 
|-id=269 bgcolor=#fefefe
| 333269 ||  || — || June 10, 2004 || Socorro || LINEAR || H || align=right data-sort-value="0.93" | 930 m || 
|-id=270 bgcolor=#FA8072
| 333270 ||  || — || September 24, 1960 || Palomar || PLS || — || align=right | 2.4 km || 
|-id=271 bgcolor=#E9E9E9
| 333271 ||  || — || September 24, 1960 || Palomar || PLS || — || align=right | 2.2 km || 
|-id=272 bgcolor=#d6d6d6
| 333272 ||  || — || September 29, 1973 || Palomar || PLS || THB || align=right | 4.2 km || 
|-id=273 bgcolor=#fefefe
| 333273 ||  || — || September 29, 1973 || Palomar || PLS || — || align=right data-sort-value="0.85" | 850 m || 
|-id=274 bgcolor=#fefefe
| 333274 ||  || — || January 7, 1994 || Kitt Peak || Spacewatch || — || align=right data-sort-value="0.74" | 740 m || 
|-id=275 bgcolor=#E9E9E9
| 333275 ||  || — || June 11, 1994 || Kitt Peak || Spacewatch || — || align=right | 2.1 km || 
|-id=276 bgcolor=#fefefe
| 333276 ||  || — || August 28, 1995 || Kitt Peak || Spacewatch || — || align=right data-sort-value="0.76" | 760 m || 
|-id=277 bgcolor=#E9E9E9
| 333277 ||  || — || December 12, 1996 || Kitt Peak || Spacewatch || EUN || align=right | 1.9 km || 
|-id=278 bgcolor=#fefefe
| 333278 ||  || — || October 3, 1997 || Kitt Peak || Spacewatch || — || align=right | 1.1 km || 
|-id=279 bgcolor=#fefefe
| 333279 ||  || — || October 2, 1997 || Kitt Peak || Spacewatch || — || align=right | 1.1 km || 
|-id=280 bgcolor=#E9E9E9
| 333280 ||  || — || August 24, 1998 || Socorro || LINEAR || — || align=right | 3.1 km || 
|-id=281 bgcolor=#fefefe
| 333281 ||  || — || September 14, 1998 || Socorro || LINEAR || — || align=right | 1.1 km || 
|-id=282 bgcolor=#d6d6d6
| 333282 ||  || — || September 26, 1998 || Socorro || LINEAR || — || align=right | 3.1 km || 
|-id=283 bgcolor=#fefefe
| 333283 ||  || — || December 22, 1998 || Kitt Peak || Spacewatch || NYS || align=right data-sort-value="0.86" | 860 m || 
|-id=284 bgcolor=#FFC2E0
| 333284 ||  || — || August 7, 1999 || Anderson Mesa || LONEOS || AMO +1kmcritical || align=right data-sort-value="0.85" | 850 m || 
|-id=285 bgcolor=#fefefe
| 333285 ||  || — || September 7, 1999 || Socorro || LINEAR || FLO || align=right data-sort-value="0.67" | 670 m || 
|-id=286 bgcolor=#E9E9E9
| 333286 ||  || — || September 9, 1999 || Socorro || LINEAR || — || align=right | 2.7 km || 
|-id=287 bgcolor=#E9E9E9
| 333287 ||  || — || September 8, 1999 || Socorro || LINEAR || — || align=right | 2.5 km || 
|-id=288 bgcolor=#E9E9E9
| 333288 ||  || — || September 29, 1999 || Catalina || CSS || JUN || align=right | 1.5 km || 
|-id=289 bgcolor=#E9E9E9
| 333289 ||  || — || October 2, 1999 || Socorro || LINEAR || EUN || align=right | 1.6 km || 
|-id=290 bgcolor=#d6d6d6
| 333290 ||  || — || October 3, 1999 || Kitt Peak || Spacewatch || — || align=right | 3.4 km || 
|-id=291 bgcolor=#E9E9E9
| 333291 ||  || — || November 3, 1999 || Socorro || LINEAR || POS || align=right | 3.1 km || 
|-id=292 bgcolor=#E9E9E9
| 333292 ||  || — || November 4, 1999 || Socorro || LINEAR || — || align=right | 2.8 km || 
|-id=293 bgcolor=#E9E9E9
| 333293 ||  || — || August 24, 2000 || Socorro || LINEAR || — || align=right | 1.0 km || 
|-id=294 bgcolor=#E9E9E9
| 333294 ||  || — || August 31, 2000 || Socorro || LINEAR || — || align=right | 1.3 km || 
|-id=295 bgcolor=#E9E9E9
| 333295 ||  || — || September 23, 2000 || Socorro || LINEAR || JUL || align=right | 1.4 km || 
|-id=296 bgcolor=#E9E9E9
| 333296 ||  || — || September 23, 2000 || Socorro || LINEAR || — || align=right | 1.8 km || 
|-id=297 bgcolor=#E9E9E9
| 333297 ||  || — || September 22, 2000 || Socorro || LINEAR || — || align=right | 1.8 km || 
|-id=298 bgcolor=#E9E9E9
| 333298 ||  || — || September 22, 2000 || Socorro || LINEAR || — || align=right | 4.3 km || 
|-id=299 bgcolor=#E9E9E9
| 333299 ||  || — || September 22, 2000 || Socorro || LINEAR || — || align=right | 3.7 km || 
|-id=300 bgcolor=#E9E9E9
| 333300 ||  || — || September 25, 2000 || Socorro || LINEAR || — || align=right | 1.3 km || 
|}

333301–333400 

|-bgcolor=#E9E9E9
| 333301 ||  || — || September 23, 2000 || Socorro || LINEAR || — || align=right | 1.3 km || 
|-id=302 bgcolor=#E9E9E9
| 333302 ||  || — || September 28, 2000 || Socorro || LINEAR || — || align=right | 1.2 km || 
|-id=303 bgcolor=#E9E9E9
| 333303 ||  || — || October 24, 2000 || Socorro || LINEAR || — || align=right | 1.3 km || 
|-id=304 bgcolor=#E9E9E9
| 333304 ||  || — || October 25, 2000 || Socorro || LINEAR || — || align=right | 1.6 km || 
|-id=305 bgcolor=#FA8072
| 333305 ||  || — || November 1, 2000 || Socorro || LINEAR || — || align=right | 1.5 km || 
|-id=306 bgcolor=#E9E9E9
| 333306 ||  || — || November 3, 2000 || Socorro || LINEAR || — || align=right | 1.3 km || 
|-id=307 bgcolor=#E9E9E9
| 333307 ||  || — || November 30, 2000 || Socorro || LINEAR || — || align=right | 1.9 km || 
|-id=308 bgcolor=#fefefe
| 333308 ||  || — || March 19, 2001 || Socorro || LINEAR || — || align=right | 1.2 km || 
|-id=309 bgcolor=#fefefe
| 333309 ||  || — || March 19, 2001 || Socorro || LINEAR || — || align=right data-sort-value="0.95" | 950 m || 
|-id=310 bgcolor=#fefefe
| 333310 ||  || — || April 13, 2001 || Socorro || LINEAR || H || align=right data-sort-value="0.90" | 900 m || 
|-id=311 bgcolor=#FA8072
| 333311 ||  || — || June 21, 2001 || Socorro || LINEAR || — || align=right data-sort-value="0.47" | 470 m || 
|-id=312 bgcolor=#FA8072
| 333312 ||  || — || June 27, 2001 || Anderson Mesa || LONEOS || — || align=right | 1.2 km || 
|-id=313 bgcolor=#d6d6d6
| 333313 ||  || — || July 18, 2001 || Palomar || NEAT || EUP || align=right | 3.9 km || 
|-id=314 bgcolor=#d6d6d6
| 333314 ||  || — || July 16, 2001 || Anderson Mesa || LONEOS || TIR || align=right | 3.6 km || 
|-id=315 bgcolor=#d6d6d6
| 333315 ||  || — || July 23, 2001 || Haleakala || NEAT || TIR || align=right | 4.4 km || 
|-id=316 bgcolor=#d6d6d6
| 333316 ||  || — || July 30, 2001 || Palomar || NEAT || — || align=right | 4.1 km || 
|-id=317 bgcolor=#d6d6d6
| 333317 ||  || — || July 27, 2001 || Anderson Mesa || LONEOS || — || align=right | 5.1 km || 
|-id=318 bgcolor=#d6d6d6
| 333318 ||  || — || July 31, 2001 || Palomar || NEAT || — || align=right | 4.2 km || 
|-id=319 bgcolor=#d6d6d6
| 333319 ||  || — || August 9, 2001 || Palomar || NEAT || — || align=right | 5.3 km || 
|-id=320 bgcolor=#d6d6d6
| 333320 ||  || — || August 13, 2001 || Haleakala || NEAT || — || align=right | 4.2 km || 
|-id=321 bgcolor=#d6d6d6
| 333321 ||  || — || August 16, 2001 || Socorro || LINEAR || Tj (2.97) || align=right | 4.1 km || 
|-id=322 bgcolor=#fefefe
| 333322 ||  || — || August 16, 2001 || Socorro || LINEAR || NYS || align=right | 1.0 km || 
|-id=323 bgcolor=#fefefe
| 333323 ||  || — || August 18, 2001 || Socorro || LINEAR || MAS || align=right data-sort-value="0.85" | 850 m || 
|-id=324 bgcolor=#d6d6d6
| 333324 ||  || — || August 22, 2001 || Kitt Peak || Spacewatch || — || align=right | 3.5 km || 
|-id=325 bgcolor=#fefefe
| 333325 ||  || — || August 21, 2001 || Haleakala || NEAT || NYS || align=right data-sort-value="0.96" | 960 m || 
|-id=326 bgcolor=#d6d6d6
| 333326 ||  || — || August 21, 2001 || Haleakala || NEAT || THB || align=right | 5.2 km || 
|-id=327 bgcolor=#d6d6d6
| 333327 ||  || — || August 23, 2001 || Anderson Mesa || LONEOS || — || align=right | 4.0 km || 
|-id=328 bgcolor=#d6d6d6
| 333328 ||  || — || August 23, 2001 || Anderson Mesa || LONEOS || — || align=right | 5.4 km || 
|-id=329 bgcolor=#fefefe
| 333329 ||  || — || August 24, 2001 || Haleakala || NEAT || ERI || align=right | 2.5 km || 
|-id=330 bgcolor=#fefefe
| 333330 ||  || — || August 19, 2001 || Socorro || LINEAR || — || align=right data-sort-value="0.89" | 890 m || 
|-id=331 bgcolor=#fefefe
| 333331 ||  || — || August 24, 2001 || Anderson Mesa || LONEOS || ERI || align=right | 2.0 km || 
|-id=332 bgcolor=#d6d6d6
| 333332 ||  || — || September 8, 2001 || Socorro || LINEAR || Tj (2.97) || align=right | 4.0 km || 
|-id=333 bgcolor=#d6d6d6
| 333333 ||  || — || September 8, 2001 || Anderson Mesa || LONEOS || — || align=right | 4.7 km || 
|-id=334 bgcolor=#fefefe
| 333334 ||  || — || September 10, 2001 || Socorro || LINEAR || H || align=right data-sort-value="0.96" | 960 m || 
|-id=335 bgcolor=#fefefe
| 333335 ||  || — || September 9, 2001 || Socorro || LINEAR || ERI || align=right | 2.1 km || 
|-id=336 bgcolor=#fefefe
| 333336 ||  || — || September 12, 2001 || Socorro || LINEAR || MAS || align=right data-sort-value="0.86" | 860 m || 
|-id=337 bgcolor=#fefefe
| 333337 ||  || — || September 12, 2001 || Socorro || LINEAR || NYS || align=right data-sort-value="0.73" | 730 m || 
|-id=338 bgcolor=#fefefe
| 333338 ||  || — || September 18, 2001 || Kitt Peak || Spacewatch || MAS || align=right data-sort-value="0.75" | 750 m || 
|-id=339 bgcolor=#fefefe
| 333339 ||  || — || September 16, 2001 || Socorro || LINEAR || — || align=right | 1.2 km || 
|-id=340 bgcolor=#d6d6d6
| 333340 ||  || — || September 20, 2001 || Socorro || LINEAR || — || align=right | 3.7 km || 
|-id=341 bgcolor=#fefefe
| 333341 ||  || — || September 20, 2001 || Socorro || LINEAR || — || align=right | 1.2 km || 
|-id=342 bgcolor=#fefefe
| 333342 ||  || — || September 19, 2001 || Socorro || LINEAR || NYS || align=right data-sort-value="0.99" | 990 m || 
|-id=343 bgcolor=#fefefe
| 333343 ||  || — || September 16, 2001 || Socorro || LINEAR || V || align=right | 1.0 km || 
|-id=344 bgcolor=#d6d6d6
| 333344 ||  || — || September 21, 2001 || Palomar || NEAT || — || align=right | 4.2 km || 
|-id=345 bgcolor=#d6d6d6
| 333345 ||  || — || September 23, 2001 || Palomar || NEAT || — || align=right | 3.9 km || 
|-id=346 bgcolor=#d6d6d6
| 333346 ||  || — || October 14, 2001 || Socorro || LINEAR || HYG || align=right | 5.2 km || 
|-id=347 bgcolor=#fefefe
| 333347 ||  || — || October 13, 2001 || Socorro || LINEAR || NYS || align=right data-sort-value="0.83" | 830 m || 
|-id=348 bgcolor=#fefefe
| 333348 ||  || — || October 11, 2001 || Palomar || NEAT || — || align=right data-sort-value="0.94" | 940 m || 
|-id=349 bgcolor=#fefefe
| 333349 ||  || — || October 11, 2001 || Palomar || NEAT || — || align=right | 1.2 km || 
|-id=350 bgcolor=#fefefe
| 333350 ||  || — || October 10, 2001 || Palomar || NEAT || — || align=right | 1.1 km || 
|-id=351 bgcolor=#d6d6d6
| 333351 ||  || — || October 15, 2001 || Kitt Peak || Spacewatch || URS || align=right | 5.1 km || 
|-id=352 bgcolor=#fefefe
| 333352 ||  || — || October 22, 2001 || Emerald Lane || L. Ball || NYS || align=right data-sort-value="0.97" | 970 m || 
|-id=353 bgcolor=#fefefe
| 333353 ||  || — || October 17, 2001 || Socorro || LINEAR || NYS || align=right data-sort-value="0.84" | 840 m || 
|-id=354 bgcolor=#fefefe
| 333354 ||  || — || October 17, 2001 || Socorro || LINEAR || V || align=right | 1.0 km || 
|-id=355 bgcolor=#fefefe
| 333355 ||  || — || October 22, 2001 || Socorro || LINEAR || — || align=right | 1.2 km || 
|-id=356 bgcolor=#fefefe
| 333356 ||  || — || October 17, 2001 || Socorro || LINEAR || — || align=right | 1.0 km || 
|-id=357 bgcolor=#fefefe
| 333357 ||  || — || November 12, 2001 || Haleakala || NEAT || — || align=right | 1.7 km || 
|-id=358 bgcolor=#FFC2E0
| 333358 ||  || — || November 17, 2001 || Socorro || LINEAR || AMO || align=right data-sort-value="0.45" | 450 m || 
|-id=359 bgcolor=#fefefe
| 333359 ||  || — || December 11, 2001 || Socorro || LINEAR || — || align=right data-sort-value="0.98" | 980 m || 
|-id=360 bgcolor=#fefefe
| 333360 ||  || — || December 14, 2001 || Socorro || LINEAR || — || align=right | 1.4 km || 
|-id=361 bgcolor=#fefefe
| 333361 ||  || — || December 15, 2001 || Socorro || LINEAR || NYS || align=right data-sort-value="0.91" | 910 m || 
|-id=362 bgcolor=#E9E9E9
| 333362 ||  || — || December 14, 2001 || Socorro || LINEAR || — || align=right | 1.8 km || 
|-id=363 bgcolor=#fefefe
| 333363 ||  || — || December 18, 2001 || Socorro || LINEAR || — || align=right | 1.2 km || 
|-id=364 bgcolor=#E9E9E9
| 333364 ||  || — || December 18, 2001 || Socorro || LINEAR || — || align=right | 1.8 km || 
|-id=365 bgcolor=#E9E9E9
| 333365 ||  || — || February 7, 2002 || Socorro || LINEAR || — || align=right | 1.7 km || 
|-id=366 bgcolor=#d6d6d6
| 333366 ||  || — || February 9, 2002 || Socorro || LINEAR || 7:4 || align=right | 7.2 km || 
|-id=367 bgcolor=#E9E9E9
| 333367 ||  || — || February 10, 2002 || Socorro || LINEAR || — || align=right | 1.0 km || 
|-id=368 bgcolor=#E9E9E9
| 333368 ||  || — || January 12, 2002 || Socorro || LINEAR || — || align=right | 2.2 km || 
|-id=369 bgcolor=#E9E9E9
| 333369 ||  || — || April 9, 2002 || Anderson Mesa || LONEOS || DOR || align=right | 2.7 km || 
|-id=370 bgcolor=#fefefe
| 333370 ||  || — || April 19, 2002 || Kitt Peak || Spacewatch || — || align=right data-sort-value="0.69" | 690 m || 
|-id=371 bgcolor=#fefefe
| 333371 ||  || — || May 11, 2002 || Socorro || LINEAR || — || align=right | 1.7 km || 
|-id=372 bgcolor=#fefefe
| 333372 ||  || — || July 13, 2002 || Palomar || NEAT || — || align=right data-sort-value="0.78" | 780 m || 
|-id=373 bgcolor=#d6d6d6
| 333373 ||  || — || October 13, 2007 || Mount Lemmon || Mount Lemmon Survey || SAN || align=right | 1.6 km || 
|-id=374 bgcolor=#d6d6d6
| 333374 ||  || — || November 10, 2009 || Kitt Peak || Spacewatch || HYG || align=right | 3.3 km || 
|-id=375 bgcolor=#fefefe
| 333375 ||  || — || August 6, 2002 || Palomar || NEAT || — || align=right data-sort-value="0.94" | 940 m || 
|-id=376 bgcolor=#d6d6d6
| 333376 ||  || — || August 6, 2002 || Palomar || NEAT || TRP || align=right | 2.8 km || 
|-id=377 bgcolor=#fefefe
| 333377 ||  || — || August 12, 2002 || Haleakala || NEAT || FLO || align=right data-sort-value="0.76" | 760 m || 
|-id=378 bgcolor=#d6d6d6
| 333378 ||  || — || July 21, 2002 || Palomar || NEAT || — || align=right | 3.5 km || 
|-id=379 bgcolor=#fefefe
| 333379 ||  || — || July 23, 2002 || Palomar || NEAT || — || align=right data-sort-value="0.89" | 890 m || 
|-id=380 bgcolor=#fefefe
| 333380 ||  || — || August 11, 2002 || Palomar || NEAT || — || align=right data-sort-value="0.67" | 670 m || 
|-id=381 bgcolor=#d6d6d6
| 333381 ||  || — || August 11, 2002 || Haleakala || NEAT || — || align=right | 4.3 km || 
|-id=382 bgcolor=#d6d6d6
| 333382 ||  || — || August 11, 2002 || Palomar || NEAT || — || align=right | 3.8 km || 
|-id=383 bgcolor=#d6d6d6
| 333383 ||  || — || November 18, 1998 || Kitt Peak || Spacewatch || KAR || align=right | 1.3 km || 
|-id=384 bgcolor=#E9E9E9
| 333384 ||  || — || August 28, 2006 || Catalina || CSS || — || align=right | 1.3 km || 
|-id=385 bgcolor=#d6d6d6
| 333385 ||  || — || November 20, 2003 || Kitt Peak || Spacewatch || EOS || align=right | 2.1 km || 
|-id=386 bgcolor=#d6d6d6
| 333386 ||  || — || April 20, 2006 || Kitt Peak || Spacewatch || — || align=right | 3.1 km || 
|-id=387 bgcolor=#fefefe
| 333387 ||  || — || September 4, 2002 || Palomar || NEAT || V || align=right data-sort-value="0.59" | 590 m || 
|-id=388 bgcolor=#fefefe
| 333388 ||  || — || September 5, 2002 || Socorro || LINEAR || — || align=right data-sort-value="0.82" | 820 m || 
|-id=389 bgcolor=#fefefe
| 333389 ||  || — || September 13, 2002 || Goodricke-Pigott || R. A. Tucker || — || align=right | 1.1 km || 
|-id=390 bgcolor=#fefefe
| 333390 ||  || — || August 12, 2002 || Haleakala || NEAT || — || align=right data-sort-value="0.95" | 950 m || 
|-id=391 bgcolor=#fefefe
| 333391 ||  || — || September 13, 2002 || Anderson Mesa || LONEOS || — || align=right data-sort-value="0.71" | 710 m || 
|-id=392 bgcolor=#fefefe
| 333392 ||  || — || September 30, 2002 || Socorro || LINEAR || — || align=right | 1.1 km || 
|-id=393 bgcolor=#fefefe
| 333393 ||  || — || October 1, 2002 || Haleakala || NEAT || — || align=right | 1.6 km || 
|-id=394 bgcolor=#d6d6d6
| 333394 ||  || — || October 2, 2002 || Socorro || LINEAR || — || align=right | 3.1 km || 
|-id=395 bgcolor=#fefefe
| 333395 ||  || — || October 4, 2002 || Socorro || LINEAR || H || align=right | 1.1 km || 
|-id=396 bgcolor=#fefefe
| 333396 ||  || — || October 3, 2002 || Palomar || NEAT || — || align=right | 1.0 km || 
|-id=397 bgcolor=#d6d6d6
| 333397 ||  || — || October 3, 2002 || Palomar || NEAT || — || align=right | 4.0 km || 
|-id=398 bgcolor=#fefefe
| 333398 ||  || — || October 4, 2002 || Palomar || NEAT || — || align=right | 2.2 km || 
|-id=399 bgcolor=#d6d6d6
| 333399 ||  || — || October 4, 2002 || Palomar || NEAT || — || align=right | 4.8 km || 
|-id=400 bgcolor=#d6d6d6
| 333400 ||  || — || October 4, 2002 || Palomar || NEAT || — || align=right | 2.8 km || 
|}

333401–333500 

|-bgcolor=#fefefe
| 333401 ||  || — || October 10, 2002 || Socorro || LINEAR || — || align=right | 2.3 km || 
|-id=402 bgcolor=#d6d6d6
| 333402 ||  || — || October 10, 2002 || Socorro || LINEAR || EMA || align=right | 5.0 km || 
|-id=403 bgcolor=#d6d6d6
| 333403 ||  || — || October 5, 2002 || Apache Point || SDSS || EMA || align=right | 4.8 km || 
|-id=404 bgcolor=#fefefe
| 333404 ||  || — || October 5, 2002 || Apache Point || SDSS || V || align=right data-sort-value="0.71" | 710 m || 
|-id=405 bgcolor=#fefefe
| 333405 ||  || — || October 10, 2002 || Apache Point || SDSS || V || align=right data-sort-value="0.67" | 670 m || 
|-id=406 bgcolor=#fefefe
| 333406 ||  || — || October 4, 2002 || Socorro || LINEAR || — || align=right | 1.5 km || 
|-id=407 bgcolor=#d6d6d6
| 333407 ||  || — || November 1, 2002 || Palomar || NEAT || ALA || align=right | 4.8 km || 
|-id=408 bgcolor=#d6d6d6
| 333408 ||  || — || November 4, 2002 || Palomar || NEAT || — || align=right | 5.5 km || 
|-id=409 bgcolor=#d6d6d6
| 333409 ||  || — || November 5, 2002 || Socorro || LINEAR || — || align=right | 5.5 km || 
|-id=410 bgcolor=#fefefe
| 333410 ||  || — || November 5, 2002 || Socorro || LINEAR || V || align=right data-sort-value="0.80" | 800 m || 
|-id=411 bgcolor=#d6d6d6
| 333411 ||  || — || November 12, 2002 || Socorro || LINEAR || — || align=right | 2.9 km || 
|-id=412 bgcolor=#C2FFFF
| 333412 ||  || — || November 16, 2002 || Palomar || NEAT || L5 || align=right | 10 km || 
|-id=413 bgcolor=#d6d6d6
| 333413 ||  || — || December 5, 2002 || Socorro || LINEAR || — || align=right | 3.4 km || 
|-id=414 bgcolor=#fefefe
| 333414 ||  || — || December 11, 2002 || Socorro || LINEAR || — || align=right data-sort-value="0.86" | 860 m || 
|-id=415 bgcolor=#d6d6d6
| 333415 ||  || — || December 11, 2002 || Palomar || NEAT || — || align=right | 3.4 km || 
|-id=416 bgcolor=#FA8072
| 333416 ||  || — || January 2, 2003 || Socorro || LINEAR || — || align=right | 1.7 km || 
|-id=417 bgcolor=#FA8072
| 333417 ||  || — || January 11, 2003 || Socorro || LINEAR || — || align=right | 1.4 km || 
|-id=418 bgcolor=#E9E9E9
| 333418 ||  || — || March 25, 2003 || Palomar || NEAT || — || align=right | 1.6 km || 
|-id=419 bgcolor=#E9E9E9
| 333419 ||  || — || March 31, 2003 || Socorro || LINEAR || — || align=right | 1.5 km || 
|-id=420 bgcolor=#E9E9E9
| 333420 ||  || — || April 7, 2003 || Kitt Peak || Spacewatch || — || align=right | 1.1 km || 
|-id=421 bgcolor=#E9E9E9
| 333421 ||  || — || April 24, 2003 || Kitt Peak || Spacewatch || — || align=right | 1.9 km || 
|-id=422 bgcolor=#E9E9E9
| 333422 ||  || — || May 22, 2003 || Kitt Peak || Spacewatch || — || align=right | 1.9 km || 
|-id=423 bgcolor=#E9E9E9
| 333423 ||  || — || May 26, 2003 || Kitt Peak || Spacewatch || — || align=right | 2.2 km || 
|-id=424 bgcolor=#E9E9E9
| 333424 ||  || — || June 26, 2003 || Socorro || LINEAR || — || align=right | 2.8 km || 
|-id=425 bgcolor=#E9E9E9
| 333425 ||  || — || July 2, 2003 || Haleakala || NEAT || — || align=right | 3.2 km || 
|-id=426 bgcolor=#E9E9E9
| 333426 ||  || — || July 24, 2003 || Palomar || NEAT || MRX || align=right | 1.4 km || 
|-id=427 bgcolor=#E9E9E9
| 333427 ||  || — || August 20, 2003 || Palomar || NEAT || — || align=right | 4.2 km || 
|-id=428 bgcolor=#E9E9E9
| 333428 ||  || — || August 20, 2003 || Palomar || NEAT || — || align=right | 3.0 km || 
|-id=429 bgcolor=#E9E9E9
| 333429 ||  || — || August 22, 2003 || Palomar || NEAT || — || align=right | 3.0 km || 
|-id=430 bgcolor=#E9E9E9
| 333430 ||  || — || August 31, 2003 || Socorro || LINEAR || TIN || align=right | 1.3 km || 
|-id=431 bgcolor=#E9E9E9
| 333431 ||  || — || September 14, 2003 || Haleakala || NEAT || — || align=right | 2.7 km || 
|-id=432 bgcolor=#E9E9E9
| 333432 ||  || — || September 15, 2003 || Haleakala || NEAT || — || align=right | 2.4 km || 
|-id=433 bgcolor=#E9E9E9
| 333433 ||  || — || September 16, 2003 || Anderson Mesa || LONEOS || — || align=right | 4.1 km || 
|-id=434 bgcolor=#E9E9E9
| 333434 ||  || — || September 17, 2003 || Socorro || LINEAR || — || align=right | 3.5 km || 
|-id=435 bgcolor=#E9E9E9
| 333435 ||  || — || September 19, 2003 || Palomar || NEAT || — || align=right | 2.3 km || 
|-id=436 bgcolor=#E9E9E9
| 333436 ||  || — || September 22, 2003 || Socorro || LINEAR || — || align=right | 3.6 km || 
|-id=437 bgcolor=#E9E9E9
| 333437 ||  || — || September 19, 2003 || Socorro || LINEAR || — || align=right | 3.4 km || 
|-id=438 bgcolor=#E9E9E9
| 333438 ||  || — || September 27, 2003 || Anderson Mesa || LONEOS || GEF || align=right | 1.6 km || 
|-id=439 bgcolor=#E9E9E9
| 333439 ||  || — || September 26, 2003 || Socorro || LINEAR || DOR || align=right | 3.1 km || 
|-id=440 bgcolor=#E9E9E9
| 333440 ||  || — || September 29, 2003 || Anderson Mesa || LONEOS || — || align=right | 3.6 km || 
|-id=441 bgcolor=#E9E9E9
| 333441 ||  || — || September 17, 2003 || Kitt Peak || Spacewatch || — || align=right | 2.5 km || 
|-id=442 bgcolor=#E9E9E9
| 333442 ||  || — || October 2, 2003 || Socorro || LINEAR || INO || align=right | 2.0 km || 
|-id=443 bgcolor=#E9E9E9
| 333443 ||  || — || October 15, 2003 || Anderson Mesa || LONEOS || — || align=right | 2.5 km || 
|-id=444 bgcolor=#E9E9E9
| 333444 ||  || — || October 16, 2003 || Palomar || NEAT || DOR || align=right | 3.0 km || 
|-id=445 bgcolor=#d6d6d6
| 333445 ||  || — || October 19, 2003 || Palomar || NEAT || BRA || align=right | 2.2 km || 
|-id=446 bgcolor=#E9E9E9
| 333446 ||  || — || October 21, 2003 || Palomar || NEAT || — || align=right | 3.3 km || 
|-id=447 bgcolor=#E9E9E9
| 333447 ||  || — || October 25, 2003 || Socorro || LINEAR || — || align=right | 2.9 km || 
|-id=448 bgcolor=#d6d6d6
| 333448 ||  || — || September 28, 2003 || Kitt Peak || Spacewatch || KOR || align=right | 1.8 km || 
|-id=449 bgcolor=#E9E9E9
| 333449 ||  || — || October 22, 2003 || Apache Point || SDSS || — || align=right | 2.8 km || 
|-id=450 bgcolor=#d6d6d6
| 333450 ||  || — || November 18, 2003 || Kitt Peak || Spacewatch || — || align=right | 2.9 km || 
|-id=451 bgcolor=#d6d6d6
| 333451 ||  || — || November 21, 2003 || Socorro || LINEAR || — || align=right | 3.5 km || 
|-id=452 bgcolor=#d6d6d6
| 333452 ||  || — || November 20, 2003 || Kitt Peak || M. W. Buie || — || align=right | 3.9 km || 
|-id=453 bgcolor=#fefefe
| 333453 ||  || — || December 18, 2003 || Socorro || LINEAR || — || align=right | 1.3 km || 
|-id=454 bgcolor=#fefefe
| 333454 ||  || — || January 21, 2004 || Socorro || LINEAR || PHO || align=right | 1.7 km || 
|-id=455 bgcolor=#fefefe
| 333455 ||  || — || March 20, 2004 || Socorro || LINEAR || PHO || align=right | 2.9 km || 
|-id=456 bgcolor=#fefefe
| 333456 ||  || — || July 21, 2004 || Siding Spring || SSS || H || align=right data-sort-value="0.88" | 880 m || 
|-id=457 bgcolor=#fefefe
| 333457 ||  || — || August 6, 2004 || Reedy Creek || J. Broughton || H || align=right data-sort-value="0.91" | 910 m || 
|-id=458 bgcolor=#fefefe
| 333458 ||  || — || August 8, 2004 || Socorro || LINEAR || H || align=right data-sort-value="0.80" | 800 m || 
|-id=459 bgcolor=#E9E9E9
| 333459 ||  || — || August 8, 2004 || Socorro || LINEAR || — || align=right | 1.0 km || 
|-id=460 bgcolor=#E9E9E9
| 333460 ||  || — || August 8, 2004 || Socorro || LINEAR || — || align=right | 2.7 km || 
|-id=461 bgcolor=#E9E9E9
| 333461 ||  || — || August 12, 2004 || Reedy Creek || J. Broughton || — || align=right | 1.2 km || 
|-id=462 bgcolor=#E9E9E9
| 333462 ||  || — || August 12, 2004 || Socorro || LINEAR || — || align=right | 1.5 km || 
|-id=463 bgcolor=#E9E9E9
| 333463 ||  || — || August 21, 2004 || Siding Spring || SSS || EUN || align=right | 1.6 km || 
|-id=464 bgcolor=#E9E9E9
| 333464 ||  || — || August 20, 2004 || Socorro || LINEAR || — || align=right | 2.7 km || 
|-id=465 bgcolor=#E9E9E9
| 333465 ||  || — || August 25, 2004 || Kitt Peak || Spacewatch || — || align=right | 1.6 km || 
|-id=466 bgcolor=#E9E9E9
| 333466 ||  || — || September 6, 2004 || Socorro || LINEAR || HNS || align=right | 1.9 km || 
|-id=467 bgcolor=#E9E9E9
| 333467 ||  || — || September 5, 2004 || Palomar || NEAT || — || align=right | 1.2 km || 
|-id=468 bgcolor=#E9E9E9
| 333468 ||  || — || September 9, 2004 || Socorro || LINEAR || — || align=right data-sort-value="0.98" | 980 m || 
|-id=469 bgcolor=#E9E9E9
| 333469 ||  || — || September 9, 2004 || Socorro || LINEAR || — || align=right | 3.5 km || 
|-id=470 bgcolor=#E9E9E9
| 333470 ||  || — || September 10, 2004 || Socorro || LINEAR || — || align=right | 1.3 km || 
|-id=471 bgcolor=#E9E9E9
| 333471 ||  || — || September 10, 2004 || Socorro || LINEAR || — || align=right | 1.4 km || 
|-id=472 bgcolor=#E9E9E9
| 333472 ||  || — || September 10, 2004 || Socorro || LINEAR || — || align=right data-sort-value="0.94" | 940 m || 
|-id=473 bgcolor=#E9E9E9
| 333473 ||  || — || September 11, 2004 || Socorro || LINEAR || — || align=right | 1.3 km || 
|-id=474 bgcolor=#fefefe
| 333474 ||  || — || September 12, 2004 || Socorro || LINEAR || H || align=right data-sort-value="0.76" | 760 m || 
|-id=475 bgcolor=#E9E9E9
| 333475 ||  || — || September 13, 2004 || Socorro || LINEAR || — || align=right | 1.2 km || 
|-id=476 bgcolor=#E9E9E9
| 333476 ||  || — || September 13, 2004 || Socorro || LINEAR || — || align=right | 1.0 km || 
|-id=477 bgcolor=#E9E9E9
| 333477 ||  || — || September 17, 2004 || Anderson Mesa || LONEOS || — || align=right | 1.0 km || 
|-id=478 bgcolor=#FFC2E0
| 333478 ||  || — || September 21, 2004 || Siding Spring || SSS || ATE +1km || align=right data-sort-value="0.83" | 830 m || 
|-id=479 bgcolor=#E9E9E9
| 333479 ||  || — || September 17, 2004 || Socorro || LINEAR || RAF || align=right | 1.4 km || 
|-id=480 bgcolor=#FFC2E0
| 333480 ||  || — || October 7, 2004 || Socorro || LINEAR || APO || align=right data-sort-value="0.32" | 320 m || 
|-id=481 bgcolor=#E9E9E9
| 333481 ||  || — || October 4, 2004 || Kitt Peak || Spacewatch || critical || align=right data-sort-value="0.98" | 980 m || 
|-id=482 bgcolor=#E9E9E9
| 333482 ||  || — || October 5, 2004 || Kitt Peak || Spacewatch || ADE || align=right | 2.1 km || 
|-id=483 bgcolor=#E9E9E9
| 333483 ||  || — || October 6, 2004 || Kitt Peak || Spacewatch || — || align=right | 1.8 km || 
|-id=484 bgcolor=#E9E9E9
| 333484 ||  || — || November 5, 2004 || Palomar || NEAT || — || align=right | 1.6 km || 
|-id=485 bgcolor=#E9E9E9
| 333485 ||  || — || November 4, 2004 || Anderson Mesa || LONEOS || — || align=right | 1.3 km || 
|-id=486 bgcolor=#E9E9E9
| 333486 ||  || — || November 4, 2004 || Kitt Peak || Spacewatch || — || align=right data-sort-value="0.85" | 850 m || 
|-id=487 bgcolor=#E9E9E9
| 333487 ||  || — || November 9, 2004 || Catalina || CSS || — || align=right | 3.1 km || 
|-id=488 bgcolor=#E9E9E9
| 333488 ||  || — || November 17, 2004 || Campo Imperatore || CINEOS || — || align=right | 1.7 km || 
|-id=489 bgcolor=#E9E9E9
| 333489 ||  || — || December 2, 2004 || Socorro || LINEAR || — || align=right | 1.5 km || 
|-id=490 bgcolor=#E9E9E9
| 333490 ||  || — || December 2, 2004 || Catalina || CSS || JUN || align=right | 1.5 km || 
|-id=491 bgcolor=#E9E9E9
| 333491 ||  || — || December 10, 2004 || Kitt Peak || Spacewatch || MRX || align=right | 1.3 km || 
|-id=492 bgcolor=#E9E9E9
| 333492 ||  || — || December 14, 2004 || Socorro || LINEAR || — || align=right | 1.9 km || 
|-id=493 bgcolor=#E9E9E9
| 333493 ||  || — || December 15, 2004 || Socorro || LINEAR || — || align=right | 2.6 km || 
|-id=494 bgcolor=#E9E9E9
| 333494 ||  || — || December 10, 2004 || Socorro || LINEAR || — || align=right | 2.0 km || 
|-id=495 bgcolor=#E9E9E9
| 333495 ||  || — || January 6, 2005 || Socorro || LINEAR || JUN || align=right | 1.5 km || 
|-id=496 bgcolor=#d6d6d6
| 333496 ||  || — || January 15, 2005 || Socorro || LINEAR || — || align=right | 3.9 km || 
|-id=497 bgcolor=#E9E9E9
| 333497 ||  || — || January 16, 2005 || Kitt Peak || Spacewatch || — || align=right | 2.5 km || 
|-id=498 bgcolor=#E9E9E9
| 333498 ||  || — || February 1, 2005 || Kitt Peak || Spacewatch || — || align=right | 2.6 km || 
|-id=499 bgcolor=#fefefe
| 333499 ||  || — || February 2, 2005 || Socorro || LINEAR || V || align=right data-sort-value="0.83" | 830 m || 
|-id=500 bgcolor=#d6d6d6
| 333500 ||  || — || February 9, 2005 || Socorro || LINEAR || TIR || align=right | 4.3 km || 
|}

333501–333600 

|-bgcolor=#d6d6d6
| 333501 ||  || — || February 9, 2005 || Anderson Mesa || LONEOS || — || align=right | 3.6 km || 
|-id=502 bgcolor=#d6d6d6
| 333502 ||  || — || March 4, 2005 || Mount Lemmon || Mount Lemmon Survey || LIX || align=right | 5.1 km || 
|-id=503 bgcolor=#d6d6d6
| 333503 ||  || — || March 4, 2005 || Socorro || LINEAR || EOS || align=right | 2.8 km || 
|-id=504 bgcolor=#d6d6d6
| 333504 ||  || — || March 11, 2005 || Anderson Mesa || LONEOS || — || align=right | 4.2 km || 
|-id=505 bgcolor=#d6d6d6
| 333505 ||  || — || April 4, 2005 || Kitt Peak || Spacewatch || — || align=right | 3.4 km || 
|-id=506 bgcolor=#fefefe
| 333506 ||  || — || May 4, 2005 || Mount Lemmon || Mount Lemmon Survey || FLO || align=right data-sort-value="0.62" | 620 m || 
|-id=507 bgcolor=#fefefe
| 333507 ||  || — || May 8, 2005 || Kitt Peak || Spacewatch || — || align=right data-sort-value="0.80" | 800 m || 
|-id=508 bgcolor=#fefefe
| 333508 Voiture ||  ||  || May 31, 2005 || Saint-Sulpice || Saint-Sulpice Obs. || — || align=right data-sort-value="0.90" | 900 m || 
|-id=509 bgcolor=#fefefe
| 333509 ||  || — || June 4, 2005 || Socorro || LINEAR || — || align=right | 1.4 km || 
|-id=510 bgcolor=#FFC2E0
| 333510 ||  || — || June 17, 2005 || Mount Lemmon || Mount Lemmon Survey || APO || align=right data-sort-value="0.61" | 610 m || 
|-id=511 bgcolor=#fefefe
| 333511 ||  || — || June 17, 2005 || Mount Lemmon || Mount Lemmon Survey || — || align=right data-sort-value="0.85" | 850 m || 
|-id=512 bgcolor=#fefefe
| 333512 ||  || — || June 30, 2005 || Kitt Peak || Spacewatch || — || align=right data-sort-value="0.68" | 680 m || 
|-id=513 bgcolor=#fefefe
| 333513 ||  || — || June 29, 2005 || Palomar || NEAT || — || align=right data-sort-value="0.94" | 940 m || 
|-id=514 bgcolor=#fefefe
| 333514 ||  || — || July 3, 2005 || Mount Lemmon || Mount Lemmon Survey || — || align=right data-sort-value="0.88" | 880 m || 
|-id=515 bgcolor=#fefefe
| 333515 ||  || — || July 11, 2005 || Kitt Peak || Spacewatch || FLO || align=right data-sort-value="0.73" | 730 m || 
|-id=516 bgcolor=#fefefe
| 333516 ||  || — || July 10, 2005 || Reedy Creek || J. Broughton || — || align=right | 1.3 km || 
|-id=517 bgcolor=#fefefe
| 333517 ||  || — || July 10, 2005 || Siding Spring || SSS || — || align=right data-sort-value="0.80" | 800 m || 
|-id=518 bgcolor=#fefefe
| 333518 ||  || — || July 27, 2005 || Palomar || NEAT || FLO || align=right data-sort-value="0.80" | 800 m || 
|-id=519 bgcolor=#fefefe
| 333519 ||  || — || July 28, 2005 || Palomar || NEAT || — || align=right data-sort-value="0.94" | 940 m || 
|-id=520 bgcolor=#fefefe
| 333520 ||  || — || July 31, 2005 || Palomar || NEAT || V || align=right data-sort-value="0.68" | 680 m || 
|-id=521 bgcolor=#FFC2E0
| 333521 ||  || — || August 3, 2005 || Palomar || NEAT || APOPHA || align=right data-sort-value="0.36" | 360 m || 
|-id=522 bgcolor=#fefefe
| 333522 ||  || — || August 2, 2005 || Socorro || LINEAR || PHO || align=right | 1.1 km || 
|-id=523 bgcolor=#fefefe
| 333523 ||  || — || August 24, 2005 || Palomar || NEAT || — || align=right data-sort-value="0.88" | 880 m || 
|-id=524 bgcolor=#fefefe
| 333524 ||  || — || August 25, 2005 || Palomar || NEAT || MAS || align=right data-sort-value="0.72" | 720 m || 
|-id=525 bgcolor=#FA8072
| 333525 ||  || — || August 27, 2005 || Anderson Mesa || LONEOS || — || align=right | 1.1 km || 
|-id=526 bgcolor=#fefefe
| 333526 ||  || — || August 26, 2005 || Palomar || NEAT || — || align=right data-sort-value="0.94" | 940 m || 
|-id=527 bgcolor=#fefefe
| 333527 ||  || — || August 29, 2005 || Palomar || NEAT || — || align=right | 2.7 km || 
|-id=528 bgcolor=#fefefe
| 333528 ||  || — || August 27, 2005 || Anderson Mesa || LONEOS || — || align=right | 1.2 km || 
|-id=529 bgcolor=#fefefe
| 333529 ||  || — || September 6, 2005 || Socorro || LINEAR || PHO || align=right | 2.8 km || 
|-id=530 bgcolor=#fefefe
| 333530 ||  || — || September 10, 2005 || Anderson Mesa || LONEOS || — || align=right | 1.2 km || 
|-id=531 bgcolor=#fefefe
| 333531 ||  || — || September 23, 2005 || Catalina || CSS || NYS || align=right data-sort-value="0.74" | 740 m || 
|-id=532 bgcolor=#fefefe
| 333532 ||  || — || September 26, 2005 || Palomar || NEAT || — || align=right data-sort-value="0.91" | 910 m || 
|-id=533 bgcolor=#fefefe
| 333533 ||  || — || September 24, 2005 || Kitt Peak || Spacewatch || NYS || align=right data-sort-value="0.61" | 610 m || 
|-id=534 bgcolor=#fefefe
| 333534 ||  || — || September 25, 2005 || Kitt Peak || Spacewatch || V || align=right | 1.0 km || 
|-id=535 bgcolor=#fefefe
| 333535 ||  || — || September 28, 2005 || Palomar || NEAT || — || align=right | 1.4 km || 
|-id=536 bgcolor=#fefefe
| 333536 ||  || — || September 29, 2005 || Mount Lemmon || Mount Lemmon Survey || — || align=right data-sort-value="0.83" | 830 m || 
|-id=537 bgcolor=#d6d6d6
| 333537 ||  || — || September 29, 2005 || Goodricke-Pigott || R. A. Tucker || 3:2 || align=right | 5.0 km || 
|-id=538 bgcolor=#fefefe
| 333538 ||  || — || September 30, 2005 || Kitt Peak || Spacewatch || — || align=right data-sort-value="0.91" | 910 m || 
|-id=539 bgcolor=#FA8072
| 333539 ||  || — || September 29, 2005 || Catalina || CSS || — || align=right | 1.0 km || 
|-id=540 bgcolor=#fefefe
| 333540 ||  || — || September 24, 2005 || Palomar || NEAT || FLO || align=right | 1.1 km || 
|-id=541 bgcolor=#fefefe
| 333541 ||  || — || October 3, 2005 || Catalina || CSS || V || align=right data-sort-value="0.92" | 920 m || 
|-id=542 bgcolor=#fefefe
| 333542 ||  || — || October 3, 2005 || Socorro || LINEAR || — || align=right | 1.1 km || 
|-id=543 bgcolor=#d6d6d6
| 333543 ||  || — || October 3, 2005 || Kitt Peak || Spacewatch || 3:2 || align=right | 7.4 km || 
|-id=544 bgcolor=#fefefe
| 333544 ||  || — || October 3, 2005 || Catalina || CSS || — || align=right data-sort-value="0.81" | 810 m || 
|-id=545 bgcolor=#fefefe
| 333545 ||  || — || October 22, 2005 || Catalina || CSS || FLO || align=right data-sort-value="0.73" | 730 m || 
|-id=546 bgcolor=#fefefe
| 333546 ||  || — || October 22, 2005 || Catalina || CSS || NYS || align=right data-sort-value="0.93" | 930 m || 
|-id=547 bgcolor=#fefefe
| 333547 ||  || — || October 24, 2005 || Kitt Peak || Spacewatch || — || align=right | 1.1 km || 
|-id=548 bgcolor=#fefefe
| 333548 ||  || — || October 22, 2005 || Kitt Peak || Spacewatch || V || align=right data-sort-value="0.99" | 990 m || 
|-id=549 bgcolor=#fefefe
| 333549 ||  || — || October 22, 2005 || Kitt Peak || Spacewatch || NYS || align=right data-sort-value="0.70" | 700 m || 
|-id=550 bgcolor=#fefefe
| 333550 ||  || — || October 22, 2005 || Kitt Peak || Spacewatch || NYS || align=right data-sort-value="0.73" | 730 m || 
|-id=551 bgcolor=#fefefe
| 333551 ||  || — || October 25, 2005 || Catalina || CSS || — || align=right | 1.1 km || 
|-id=552 bgcolor=#E9E9E9
| 333552 ||  || — || October 27, 2005 || Kitt Peak || Spacewatch || — || align=right | 1.3 km || 
|-id=553 bgcolor=#fefefe
| 333553 ||  || — || October 28, 2005 || Mount Lemmon || Mount Lemmon Survey || H || align=right data-sort-value="0.51" | 510 m || 
|-id=554 bgcolor=#fefefe
| 333554 ||  || — || November 1, 2005 || Kitt Peak || Spacewatch || — || align=right data-sort-value="0.94" | 940 m || 
|-id=555 bgcolor=#FFC2E0
| 333555 ||  || — || November 4, 2005 || Socorro || LINEAR || AMO +1km || align=right | 1.2 km || 
|-id=556 bgcolor=#E9E9E9
| 333556 ||  || — || November 6, 2005 || Kitt Peak || Spacewatch || JUL || align=right | 1.3 km || 
|-id=557 bgcolor=#fefefe
| 333557 ||  || — || November 1, 2005 || Apache Point || A. C. Becker || — || align=right | 1.2 km || 
|-id=558 bgcolor=#fefefe
| 333558 ||  || — || November 22, 2005 || Kitt Peak || Spacewatch || — || align=right | 1.00 km || 
|-id=559 bgcolor=#FA8072
| 333559 ||  || — || November 26, 2005 || Kitt Peak || Spacewatch || H || align=right data-sort-value="0.77" | 770 m || 
|-id=560 bgcolor=#E9E9E9
| 333560 ||  || — || December 6, 2005 || Kitt Peak || Spacewatch || MAR || align=right | 1.2 km || 
|-id=561 bgcolor=#E9E9E9
| 333561 ||  || — || December 27, 2005 || Catalina || CSS || — || align=right | 4.1 km || 
|-id=562 bgcolor=#E9E9E9
| 333562 ||  || — || December 26, 2005 || Kitt Peak || Spacewatch || — || align=right | 2.3 km || 
|-id=563 bgcolor=#fefefe
| 333563 ||  || — || December 29, 2005 || Socorro || LINEAR || H || align=right | 1.2 km || 
|-id=564 bgcolor=#E9E9E9
| 333564 ||  || — || December 29, 2005 || Kitt Peak || Spacewatch || — || align=right | 1.1 km || 
|-id=565 bgcolor=#fefefe
| 333565 ||  || — || January 6, 2006 || Catalina || CSS || H || align=right | 1.1 km || 
|-id=566 bgcolor=#fefefe
| 333566 ||  || — || January 6, 2006 || Anderson Mesa || LONEOS || H || align=right data-sort-value="0.88" | 880 m || 
|-id=567 bgcolor=#fefefe
| 333567 ||  || — || January 22, 2006 || Anderson Mesa || LONEOS || H || align=right data-sort-value="0.74" | 740 m || 
|-id=568 bgcolor=#E9E9E9
| 333568 ||  || — || January 20, 2006 || Kitt Peak || Spacewatch || — || align=right | 3.6 km || 
|-id=569 bgcolor=#E9E9E9
| 333569 ||  || — || January 25, 2006 || Kitt Peak || Spacewatch || — || align=right | 3.6 km || 
|-id=570 bgcolor=#E9E9E9
| 333570 ||  || — || January 25, 2006 || Kitt Peak || Spacewatch || — || align=right | 3.3 km || 
|-id=571 bgcolor=#E9E9E9
| 333571 ||  || — || January 27, 2006 || Mount Lemmon || Mount Lemmon Survey || — || align=right | 2.6 km || 
|-id=572 bgcolor=#E9E9E9
| 333572 ||  || — || February 27, 2006 || Kitt Peak || Spacewatch || — || align=right | 3.1 km || 
|-id=573 bgcolor=#d6d6d6
| 333573 ||  || — || April 24, 2006 || Kitt Peak || Spacewatch || — || align=right | 3.4 km || 
|-id=574 bgcolor=#d6d6d6
| 333574 ||  || — || April 30, 2006 || Kitt Peak || Spacewatch || — || align=right | 3.1 km || 
|-id=575 bgcolor=#d6d6d6
| 333575 ||  || — || May 4, 2006 || Kitt Peak || Spacewatch || — || align=right | 2.3 km || 
|-id=576 bgcolor=#d6d6d6
| 333576 ||  || — || May 10, 2006 || Palomar || NEAT || — || align=right | 4.4 km || 
|-id=577 bgcolor=#d6d6d6
| 333577 ||  || — || May 22, 2006 || Kitt Peak || Spacewatch || — || align=right | 3.9 km || 
|-id=578 bgcolor=#FFC2E0
| 333578 ||  || — || May 31, 2006 || Mount Lemmon || Mount Lemmon Survey || APOPHA || align=right data-sort-value="0.2" | 200 m || 
|-id=579 bgcolor=#fefefe
| 333579 ||  || — || September 17, 2006 || Catalina || CSS || — || align=right data-sort-value="0.97" | 970 m || 
|-id=580 bgcolor=#fefefe
| 333580 ||  || — || March 10, 2005 || Anderson Mesa || LONEOS || — || align=right data-sort-value="0.94" | 940 m || 
|-id=581 bgcolor=#E9E9E9
| 333581 ||  || — || November 16, 2006 || Kitt Peak || Spacewatch || — || align=right data-sort-value="0.92" | 920 m || 
|-id=582 bgcolor=#fefefe
| 333582 ||  || — || November 20, 2006 || Kitt Peak || Spacewatch || FLO || align=right data-sort-value="0.73" | 730 m || 
|-id=583 bgcolor=#fefefe
| 333583 ||  || — || December 12, 2006 || Kitt Peak || Spacewatch || — || align=right | 1.3 km || 
|-id=584 bgcolor=#fefefe
| 333584 ||  || — || December 11, 2006 || Kitt Peak || Spacewatch || — || align=right | 1.0 km || 
|-id=585 bgcolor=#fefefe
| 333585 ||  || — || December 16, 2006 || Kitt Peak || Spacewatch || FLO || align=right data-sort-value="0.78" | 780 m || 
|-id=586 bgcolor=#fefefe
| 333586 ||  || — || January 8, 2007 || Mount Lemmon || Mount Lemmon Survey || — || align=right | 1.0 km || 
|-id=587 bgcolor=#fefefe
| 333587 ||  || — || January 17, 2007 || Kitt Peak || Spacewatch || — || align=right data-sort-value="0.94" | 940 m || 
|-id=588 bgcolor=#fefefe
| 333588 ||  || — || January 24, 2007 || Mount Lemmon || Mount Lemmon Survey || V || align=right data-sort-value="0.95" | 950 m || 
|-id=589 bgcolor=#fefefe
| 333589 ||  || — || February 6, 2007 || Palomar || NEAT || — || align=right | 1.3 km || 
|-id=590 bgcolor=#E9E9E9
| 333590 ||  || — || February 9, 2007 || Altschwendt || W. Ries || — || align=right | 2.8 km || 
|-id=591 bgcolor=#fefefe
| 333591 ||  || — || February 6, 2007 || Mount Lemmon || Mount Lemmon Survey || SVE || align=right | 3.0 km || 
|-id=592 bgcolor=#E9E9E9
| 333592 ||  || — || February 9, 2007 || Kitt Peak || Spacewatch || — || align=right data-sort-value="0.93" | 930 m || 
|-id=593 bgcolor=#E9E9E9
| 333593 ||  || — || February 17, 2007 || Kitt Peak || Spacewatch || — || align=right | 1.2 km || 
|-id=594 bgcolor=#E9E9E9
| 333594 ||  || — || March 9, 2007 || Mount Lemmon || Mount Lemmon Survey || — || align=right | 1.3 km || 
|-id=595 bgcolor=#d6d6d6
| 333595 ||  || — || March 10, 2007 || Mount Lemmon || Mount Lemmon Survey || — || align=right | 3.9 km || 
|-id=596 bgcolor=#E9E9E9
| 333596 ||  || — || March 11, 2007 || Kitt Peak || Spacewatch || — || align=right | 2.2 km || 
|-id=597 bgcolor=#E9E9E9
| 333597 ||  || — || March 20, 2007 || Mount Lemmon || Mount Lemmon Survey || — || align=right | 1.2 km || 
|-id=598 bgcolor=#E9E9E9
| 333598 ||  || — || March 11, 2007 || Anderson Mesa || LONEOS || — || align=right | 1.7 km || 
|-id=599 bgcolor=#E9E9E9
| 333599 ||  || — || April 7, 2007 || Catalina || CSS || — || align=right | 2.2 km || 
|-id=600 bgcolor=#E9E9E9
| 333600 ||  || — || April 7, 2007 || Mount Lemmon || Mount Lemmon Survey || JUN || align=right data-sort-value="0.93" | 930 m || 
|}

333601–333700 

|-bgcolor=#E9E9E9
| 333601 ||  || — || April 11, 2007 || Catalina || CSS || — || align=right | 1.4 km || 
|-id=602 bgcolor=#E9E9E9
| 333602 ||  || — || April 14, 2007 || Kitt Peak || Spacewatch || — || align=right | 2.6 km || 
|-id=603 bgcolor=#E9E9E9
| 333603 ||  || — || April 14, 2007 || Kitt Peak || Spacewatch || — || align=right | 1.6 km || 
|-id=604 bgcolor=#E9E9E9
| 333604 ||  || — || April 14, 2007 || Kitt Peak || Spacewatch || XIZ || align=right | 1.4 km || 
|-id=605 bgcolor=#E9E9E9
| 333605 ||  || — || December 5, 2005 || Mount Lemmon || Mount Lemmon Survey || — || align=right | 1.5 km || 
|-id=606 bgcolor=#E9E9E9
| 333606 ||  || — || May 10, 2007 || Anderson Mesa || LONEOS || — || align=right | 3.1 km || 
|-id=607 bgcolor=#E9E9E9
| 333607 || 2007 LY || — || June 9, 2007 || Vicques || M. Ory || — || align=right | 2.4 km || 
|-id=608 bgcolor=#d6d6d6
| 333608 ||  || — || May 10, 2007 || Mount Lemmon || Mount Lemmon Survey || EOS || align=right | 2.2 km || 
|-id=609 bgcolor=#E9E9E9
| 333609 ||  || — || June 9, 2007 || Kitt Peak || Spacewatch || — || align=right | 2.2 km || 
|-id=610 bgcolor=#d6d6d6
| 333610 ||  || — || August 12, 2007 || Socorro || LINEAR || — || align=right | 6.4 km || 
|-id=611 bgcolor=#d6d6d6
| 333611 ||  || — || August 23, 2007 || Siding Spring || SSS || — || align=right | 4.0 km || 
|-id=612 bgcolor=#d6d6d6
| 333612 ||  || — || September 5, 2007 || Siding Spring || K. Sárneczky, L. Kiss || — || align=right | 3.3 km || 
|-id=613 bgcolor=#E9E9E9
| 333613 ||  || — || September 10, 2007 || Mount Lemmon || Mount Lemmon Survey || — || align=right | 1.5 km || 
|-id=614 bgcolor=#d6d6d6
| 333614 ||  || — || September 13, 2007 || Mount Lemmon || Mount Lemmon Survey || — || align=right | 4.8 km || 
|-id=615 bgcolor=#d6d6d6
| 333615 ||  || — || September 19, 2007 || Mayhill || A. Lowe || — || align=right | 4.8 km || 
|-id=616 bgcolor=#d6d6d6
| 333616 ||  || — || October 6, 2007 || Socorro || LINEAR || — || align=right | 3.2 km || 
|-id=617 bgcolor=#d6d6d6
| 333617 ||  || — || October 8, 2007 || Catalina || CSS || — || align=right | 3.9 km || 
|-id=618 bgcolor=#d6d6d6
| 333618 ||  || — || October 11, 2007 || Kitt Peak || Spacewatch || — || align=right | 2.4 km || 
|-id=619 bgcolor=#d6d6d6
| 333619 ||  || — || September 9, 2007 || Kitt Peak || Spacewatch || — || align=right | 3.0 km || 
|-id=620 bgcolor=#d6d6d6
| 333620 ||  || — || October 14, 2007 || Catalina || CSS || — || align=right | 3.7 km || 
|-id=621 bgcolor=#fefefe
| 333621 ||  || — || November 2, 2007 || Socorro || LINEAR || H || align=right data-sort-value="0.73" | 730 m || 
|-id=622 bgcolor=#d6d6d6
| 333622 ||  || — || November 2, 2007 || Tiki || N. Teamo || LIX || align=right | 3.6 km || 
|-id=623 bgcolor=#d6d6d6
| 333623 ||  || — || November 3, 2007 || Dauban || Chante-Perdrix Obs. || — || align=right | 3.8 km || 
|-id=624 bgcolor=#d6d6d6
| 333624 ||  || — || November 6, 2007 || Needville || Needville Obs. || SYL7:4 || align=right | 6.1 km || 
|-id=625 bgcolor=#d6d6d6
| 333625 ||  || — || November 3, 2007 || Kitt Peak || Spacewatch || 7:4 || align=right | 4.7 km || 
|-id=626 bgcolor=#E9E9E9
| 333626 ||  || — || January 10, 2008 || Mount Lemmon || Mount Lemmon Survey || — || align=right | 2.4 km || 
|-id=627 bgcolor=#fefefe
| 333627 ||  || — || March 4, 2008 || Mount Lemmon || Mount Lemmon Survey || NYS || align=right data-sort-value="0.71" | 710 m || 
|-id=628 bgcolor=#fefefe
| 333628 ||  || — || March 7, 2008 || Socorro || LINEAR || — || align=right data-sort-value="0.85" | 850 m || 
|-id=629 bgcolor=#fefefe
| 333629 ||  || — || March 10, 2008 || Kitt Peak || Spacewatch || — || align=right data-sort-value="0.80" | 800 m || 
|-id=630 bgcolor=#fefefe
| 333630 ||  || — || March 26, 2008 || Kitt Peak || Spacewatch || — || align=right data-sort-value="0.82" | 820 m || 
|-id=631 bgcolor=#fefefe
| 333631 ||  || — || April 5, 2008 || Mount Lemmon || Mount Lemmon Survey || — || align=right data-sort-value="0.95" | 950 m || 
|-id=632 bgcolor=#fefefe
| 333632 ||  || — || April 5, 2008 || Mount Lemmon || Mount Lemmon Survey || NYS || align=right data-sort-value="0.65" | 650 m || 
|-id=633 bgcolor=#fefefe
| 333633 ||  || — || April 8, 2008 || Kitt Peak || Spacewatch || FLO || align=right data-sort-value="0.83" | 830 m || 
|-id=634 bgcolor=#fefefe
| 333634 ||  || — || April 9, 2008 || Catalina || CSS || PHO || align=right | 1.3 km || 
|-id=635 bgcolor=#fefefe
| 333635 ||  || — || May 31, 2008 || Kitt Peak || Spacewatch || — || align=right data-sort-value="0.78" | 780 m || 
|-id=636 bgcolor=#E9E9E9
| 333636 Reboul ||  ||  || August 26, 2008 || Pises || Pises Obs. || — || align=right | 1.2 km || 
|-id=637 bgcolor=#E9E9E9
| 333637 ||  || — || August 26, 2008 || La Sagra || OAM Obs. || RAF || align=right | 1.2 km || 
|-id=638 bgcolor=#E9E9E9
| 333638 ||  || — || August 26, 2008 || Dauban || F. Kugel || ADE || align=right | 2.5 km || 
|-id=639 bgcolor=#E9E9E9
| 333639 Yaima ||  ||  || August 21, 2008 || Ishigakijima || Ishigakijima Obs. || MAR || align=right | 1.2 km || 
|-id=640 bgcolor=#E9E9E9
| 333640 ||  || — || August 26, 2008 || Socorro || LINEAR || — || align=right | 1.3 km || 
|-id=641 bgcolor=#E9E9E9
| 333641 ||  || — || August 26, 2008 || Socorro || LINEAR || — || align=right | 2.5 km || 
|-id=642 bgcolor=#E9E9E9
| 333642 ||  || — || August 30, 2008 || Socorro || LINEAR || — || align=right | 2.1 km || 
|-id=643 bgcolor=#E9E9E9
| 333643 ||  || — || August 30, 2008 || Socorro || LINEAR || — || align=right | 3.3 km || 
|-id=644 bgcolor=#E9E9E9
| 333644 ||  || — || August 23, 2008 || Kitt Peak || Spacewatch || — || align=right | 1.7 km || 
|-id=645 bgcolor=#E9E9E9
| 333645 ||  || — || September 2, 2008 || Kitt Peak || Spacewatch || — || align=right | 1.4 km || 
|-id=646 bgcolor=#E9E9E9
| 333646 ||  || — || September 4, 2008 || Kitt Peak || Spacewatch || — || align=right | 2.0 km || 
|-id=647 bgcolor=#E9E9E9
| 333647 ||  || — || September 6, 2008 || Catalina || CSS || — || align=right | 1.7 km || 
|-id=648 bgcolor=#E9E9E9
| 333648 ||  || — || September 7, 2008 || Catalina || CSS || — || align=right | 2.3 km || 
|-id=649 bgcolor=#E9E9E9
| 333649 ||  || — || September 9, 2008 || Catalina || CSS || EUN || align=right | 1.8 km || 
|-id=650 bgcolor=#E9E9E9
| 333650 ||  || — || September 22, 2008 || Socorro || LINEAR || — || align=right | 3.8 km || 
|-id=651 bgcolor=#E9E9E9
| 333651 ||  || — || January 31, 2006 || Kitt Peak || Spacewatch || — || align=right | 1.7 km || 
|-id=652 bgcolor=#E9E9E9
| 333652 ||  || — || September 20, 2008 || Mount Lemmon || Mount Lemmon Survey || — || align=right | 2.1 km || 
|-id=653 bgcolor=#E9E9E9
| 333653 ||  || — || September 19, 2008 || Kitt Peak || Spacewatch || AGN || align=right | 1.6 km || 
|-id=654 bgcolor=#E9E9E9
| 333654 ||  || — || March 10, 2007 || Kitt Peak || Spacewatch || — || align=right | 1.2 km || 
|-id=655 bgcolor=#E9E9E9
| 333655 ||  || — || September 20, 2008 || Mount Lemmon || Mount Lemmon Survey || — || align=right | 1.7 km || 
|-id=656 bgcolor=#E9E9E9
| 333656 ||  || — || September 20, 2008 || Mount Lemmon || Mount Lemmon Survey || — || align=right | 2.5 km || 
|-id=657 bgcolor=#E9E9E9
| 333657 ||  || — || September 20, 2008 || Mount Lemmon || Mount Lemmon Survey || — || align=right | 2.3 km || 
|-id=658 bgcolor=#E9E9E9
| 333658 ||  || — || September 23, 2008 || Catalina || CSS || MAR || align=right | 1.7 km || 
|-id=659 bgcolor=#E9E9E9
| 333659 ||  || — || September 5, 2008 || Kitt Peak || Spacewatch || — || align=right | 2.2 km || 
|-id=660 bgcolor=#E9E9E9
| 333660 ||  || — || September 28, 2008 || Socorro || LINEAR || — || align=right | 1.1 km || 
|-id=661 bgcolor=#E9E9E9
| 333661 ||  || — || September 28, 2008 || Socorro || LINEAR || JUN || align=right | 1.3 km || 
|-id=662 bgcolor=#E9E9E9
| 333662 ||  || — || September 22, 2008 || Catalina || CSS || MAR || align=right | 1.6 km || 
|-id=663 bgcolor=#E9E9E9
| 333663 ||  || — || September 29, 2008 || Catalina || CSS || HEN || align=right | 1.3 km || 
|-id=664 bgcolor=#E9E9E9
| 333664 ||  || — || September 29, 2008 || Catalina || CSS || — || align=right | 2.0 km || 
|-id=665 bgcolor=#E9E9E9
| 333665 ||  || — || September 21, 2008 || Catalina || CSS || — || align=right | 1.9 km || 
|-id=666 bgcolor=#E9E9E9
| 333666 ||  || — || September 24, 2008 || Catalina || CSS || — || align=right | 2.9 km || 
|-id=667 bgcolor=#E9E9E9
| 333667 ||  || — || September 24, 2008 || Kitt Peak || Spacewatch || MRX || align=right | 1.3 km || 
|-id=668 bgcolor=#E9E9E9
| 333668 ||  || — || September 22, 2008 || Catalina || CSS || — || align=right | 2.5 km || 
|-id=669 bgcolor=#E9E9E9
| 333669 ||  || — || September 23, 2008 || Catalina || CSS || JUN || align=right | 1.4 km || 
|-id=670 bgcolor=#E9E9E9
| 333670 ||  || — || September 23, 2008 || Mount Lemmon || Mount Lemmon Survey || — || align=right | 2.9 km || 
|-id=671 bgcolor=#E9E9E9
| 333671 ||  || — || September 28, 2008 || Catalina || CSS || — || align=right | 1.9 km || 
|-id=672 bgcolor=#E9E9E9
| 333672 ||  || — || October 1, 2008 || Mount Lemmon || Mount Lemmon Survey || — || align=right | 1.5 km || 
|-id=673 bgcolor=#E9E9E9
| 333673 ||  || — || October 1, 2008 || Goodricke-Pigott || R. A. Tucker || — || align=right | 1.3 km || 
|-id=674 bgcolor=#d6d6d6
| 333674 ||  || — || October 2, 2008 || Kitt Peak || Spacewatch || — || align=right | 4.0 km || 
|-id=675 bgcolor=#E9E9E9
| 333675 ||  || — || October 2, 2008 || Mount Lemmon || Mount Lemmon Survey || NEM || align=right | 2.5 km || 
|-id=676 bgcolor=#E9E9E9
| 333676 ||  || — || October 7, 2008 || Mount Lemmon || Mount Lemmon Survey || — || align=right | 3.0 km || 
|-id=677 bgcolor=#E9E9E9
| 333677 ||  || — || October 8, 2008 || Catalina || CSS || MAR || align=right | 1.1 km || 
|-id=678 bgcolor=#E9E9E9
| 333678 ||  || — || October 8, 2008 || Mount Lemmon || Mount Lemmon Survey || — || align=right | 2.5 km || 
|-id=679 bgcolor=#E9E9E9
| 333679 ||  || — || October 1, 2008 || Catalina || CSS || — || align=right | 1.2 km || 
|-id=680 bgcolor=#E9E9E9
| 333680 ||  || — || October 6, 2008 || Catalina || CSS || — || align=right | 2.6 km || 
|-id=681 bgcolor=#d6d6d6
| 333681 ||  || — || October 7, 2008 || Mount Lemmon || Mount Lemmon Survey || — || align=right | 2.8 km || 
|-id=682 bgcolor=#E9E9E9
| 333682 ||  || — || October 8, 2008 || Catalina || CSS || — || align=right | 3.3 km || 
|-id=683 bgcolor=#E9E9E9
| 333683 ||  || — || October 9, 2008 || Catalina || CSS || — || align=right | 2.8 km || 
|-id=684 bgcolor=#d6d6d6
| 333684 ||  || — || October 20, 2008 || Kitt Peak || Spacewatch || — || align=right | 2.5 km || 
|-id=685 bgcolor=#E9E9E9
| 333685 ||  || — || October 20, 2008 || Kitt Peak || Spacewatch || — || align=right | 2.1 km || 
|-id=686 bgcolor=#d6d6d6
| 333686 ||  || — || October 28, 2008 || Mount Lemmon || Mount Lemmon Survey || EUP || align=right | 6.9 km || 
|-id=687 bgcolor=#E9E9E9
| 333687 ||  || — || October 25, 2008 || Socorro || LINEAR || — || align=right | 3.4 km || 
|-id=688 bgcolor=#d6d6d6
| 333688 ||  || — || October 21, 2008 || Kitt Peak || Spacewatch || CHA || align=right | 2.1 km || 
|-id=689 bgcolor=#d6d6d6
| 333689 ||  || — || October 22, 2008 || Kitt Peak || Spacewatch || EMA || align=right | 5.0 km || 
|-id=690 bgcolor=#E9E9E9
| 333690 ||  || — || September 23, 2008 || Kitt Peak || Spacewatch || GEF || align=right | 1.7 km || 
|-id=691 bgcolor=#E9E9E9
| 333691 ||  || — || October 24, 2008 || Mount Lemmon || Mount Lemmon Survey || — || align=right | 3.6 km || 
|-id=692 bgcolor=#d6d6d6
| 333692 ||  || — || October 24, 2008 || Mount Lemmon || Mount Lemmon Survey || KOR || align=right | 1.5 km || 
|-id=693 bgcolor=#d6d6d6
| 333693 ||  || — || October 9, 2008 || Mount Lemmon || Mount Lemmon Survey || — || align=right | 3.2 km || 
|-id=694 bgcolor=#E9E9E9
| 333694 ||  || — || October 1, 2008 || Catalina || CSS || — || align=right | 3.4 km || 
|-id=695 bgcolor=#E9E9E9
| 333695 ||  || — || October 28, 2008 || Catalina || CSS || — || align=right | 2.2 km || 
|-id=696 bgcolor=#d6d6d6
| 333696 ||  || — || October 30, 2008 || Kitt Peak || Spacewatch || — || align=right | 2.9 km || 
|-id=697 bgcolor=#E9E9E9
| 333697 ||  || — || October 27, 2008 || Catalina || CSS || — || align=right | 2.3 km || 
|-id=698 bgcolor=#E9E9E9
| 333698 ||  || — || November 1, 2008 || Catalina || CSS || — || align=right | 2.7 km || 
|-id=699 bgcolor=#d6d6d6
| 333699 ||  || — || November 17, 2008 || Kitt Peak || Spacewatch || KOR || align=right | 1.5 km || 
|-id=700 bgcolor=#E9E9E9
| 333700 ||  || — || November 17, 2008 || Kitt Peak || Spacewatch || HEN || align=right | 1.4 km || 
|}

333701–333800 

|-bgcolor=#E9E9E9
| 333701 ||  || — || November 18, 2008 || Socorro || LINEAR || — || align=right | 1.9 km || 
|-id=702 bgcolor=#d6d6d6
| 333702 ||  || — || November 24, 2008 || Mount Lemmon || Mount Lemmon Survey || — || align=right | 3.4 km || 
|-id=703 bgcolor=#d6d6d6
| 333703 ||  || — || November 1, 2008 || Mount Lemmon || Mount Lemmon Survey || — || align=right | 3.6 km || 
|-id=704 bgcolor=#d6d6d6
| 333704 ||  || — || December 1, 2008 || Dauban || F. Kugel || KOR || align=right | 1.7 km || 
|-id=705 bgcolor=#d6d6d6
| 333705 ||  || — || December 1, 2008 || Kitt Peak || Spacewatch || — || align=right | 3.1 km || 
|-id=706 bgcolor=#d6d6d6
| 333706 ||  || — || December 5, 2008 || Kitt Peak || Spacewatch || — || align=right | 3.6 km || 
|-id=707 bgcolor=#FFC2E0
| 333707 ||  || — || December 31, 2008 || Kitt Peak || Spacewatch || APO || align=right data-sort-value="0.46" | 460 m || 
|-id=708 bgcolor=#d6d6d6
| 333708 ||  || — || December 30, 2008 || Kitt Peak || Spacewatch || — || align=right | 5.8 km || 
|-id=709 bgcolor=#d6d6d6
| 333709 ||  || — || December 30, 2008 || Kitt Peak || Spacewatch || SYL7:4 || align=right | 6.5 km || 
|-id=710 bgcolor=#d6d6d6
| 333710 ||  || — || January 1, 2009 || Kitt Peak || Spacewatch || — || align=right | 3.2 km || 
|-id=711 bgcolor=#d6d6d6
| 333711 ||  || — || January 18, 2009 || Socorro || LINEAR || — || align=right | 4.3 km || 
|-id=712 bgcolor=#d6d6d6
| 333712 ||  || — || February 18, 2009 || La Sagra || OAM Obs. || — || align=right | 5.6 km || 
|-id=713 bgcolor=#E9E9E9
| 333713 ||  || — || February 20, 2009 || Kitt Peak || Spacewatch || — || align=right | 1.7 km || 
|-id=714 bgcolor=#fefefe
| 333714 ||  || — || August 20, 2009 || Kitt Peak || Spacewatch || — || align=right data-sort-value="0.75" | 750 m || 
|-id=715 bgcolor=#fefefe
| 333715 ||  || — || September 12, 2009 || Kitt Peak || Spacewatch || — || align=right data-sort-value="0.63" | 630 m || 
|-id=716 bgcolor=#fefefe
| 333716 ||  || — || September 15, 2009 || Kitt Peak || Spacewatch || MAS || align=right data-sort-value="0.63" | 630 m || 
|-id=717 bgcolor=#fefefe
| 333717 Alexgreaves ||  ||  || September 16, 2009 || Mayhill || N. Falla || FLO || align=right data-sort-value="0.61" | 610 m || 
|-id=718 bgcolor=#fefefe
| 333718 ||  || — || September 17, 2009 || Kitt Peak || Spacewatch || — || align=right data-sort-value="0.76" | 760 m || 
|-id=719 bgcolor=#fefefe
| 333719 ||  || — || September 18, 2009 || Kitt Peak || Spacewatch || FLO || align=right data-sort-value="0.48" | 480 m || 
|-id=720 bgcolor=#fefefe
| 333720 ||  || — || September 19, 2009 || Moletai || K. Černis, J. Zdanavičius || FLO || align=right data-sort-value="0.67" | 670 m || 
|-id=721 bgcolor=#fefefe
| 333721 ||  || — || September 18, 2009 || Kitt Peak || Spacewatch || — || align=right data-sort-value="0.77" | 770 m || 
|-id=722 bgcolor=#fefefe
| 333722 ||  || — || September 27, 2009 || Mount Lemmon || Mount Lemmon Survey || — || align=right | 1.6 km || 
|-id=723 bgcolor=#fefefe
| 333723 ||  || — || October 14, 2009 || La Sagra || OAM Obs. || FLO || align=right data-sort-value="0.72" | 720 m || 
|-id=724 bgcolor=#fefefe
| 333724 ||  || — || October 14, 2009 || La Sagra || OAM Obs. || FLO || align=right data-sort-value="0.75" | 750 m || 
|-id=725 bgcolor=#FA8072
| 333725 ||  || — || October 14, 2009 || La Sagra || OAM Obs. || — || align=right | 1.0 km || 
|-id=726 bgcolor=#fefefe
| 333726 ||  || — || October 19, 2009 || Dauban || F. Kugel || — || align=right | 1.1 km || 
|-id=727 bgcolor=#fefefe
| 333727 ||  || — || April 14, 2005 || Kitt Peak || Spacewatch || FLO || align=right data-sort-value="0.64" | 640 m || 
|-id=728 bgcolor=#fefefe
| 333728 ||  || — || September 23, 2009 || Mount Lemmon || Mount Lemmon Survey || FLO || align=right data-sort-value="0.85" | 850 m || 
|-id=729 bgcolor=#fefefe
| 333729 ||  || — || October 21, 2009 || Mount Lemmon || Mount Lemmon Survey || MAS || align=right data-sort-value="0.81" | 810 m || 
|-id=730 bgcolor=#fefefe
| 333730 ||  || — || October 23, 2009 || Kitt Peak || Spacewatch || — || align=right data-sort-value="0.81" | 810 m || 
|-id=731 bgcolor=#fefefe
| 333731 ||  || — || November 9, 2009 || Mount Lemmon || Mount Lemmon Survey || V || align=right data-sort-value="0.91" | 910 m || 
|-id=732 bgcolor=#fefefe
| 333732 ||  || — || November 9, 2009 || Catalina || CSS || — || align=right data-sort-value="0.90" | 900 m || 
|-id=733 bgcolor=#fefefe
| 333733 ||  || — || November 11, 2009 || Kitt Peak || Spacewatch || fast? || align=right data-sort-value="0.84" | 840 m || 
|-id=734 bgcolor=#fefefe
| 333734 ||  || — || November 8, 2009 || Mount Lemmon || Mount Lemmon Survey || SUL || align=right | 2.5 km || 
|-id=735 bgcolor=#fefefe
| 333735 ||  || — || November 9, 2009 || Mount Lemmon || Mount Lemmon Survey || NYS || align=right data-sort-value="0.77" | 770 m || 
|-id=736 bgcolor=#E9E9E9
| 333736 ||  || — || November 17, 2009 || Kitt Peak || Spacewatch || — || align=right | 2.6 km || 
|-id=737 bgcolor=#E9E9E9
| 333737 ||  || — || November 21, 2009 || Mount Lemmon || Mount Lemmon Survey || — || align=right | 3.9 km || 
|-id=738 bgcolor=#fefefe
| 333738 ||  || — || November 22, 2009 || Kitt Peak || Spacewatch || FLO || align=right data-sort-value="0.87" | 870 m || 
|-id=739 bgcolor=#fefefe
| 333739 ||  || — || November 23, 2009 || Kitt Peak || Spacewatch || NYS || align=right data-sort-value="0.65" | 650 m || 
|-id=740 bgcolor=#fefefe
| 333740 || 2009 XB || — || December 5, 2009 || Pla D'Arguines || R. Ferrando || — || align=right | 1.4 km || 
|-id=741 bgcolor=#E9E9E9
| 333741 ||  || — || May 2, 2003 || Kitt Peak || Spacewatch || — || align=right | 1.7 km || 
|-id=742 bgcolor=#E9E9E9
| 333742 ||  || — || December 15, 2009 || Mount Lemmon || Mount Lemmon Survey || MAR || align=right | 1.4 km || 
|-id=743 bgcolor=#fefefe
| 333743 ||  || — || December 17, 2009 || Mount Lemmon || Mount Lemmon Survey || — || align=right data-sort-value="0.77" | 770 m || 
|-id=744 bgcolor=#E9E9E9
| 333744 Pau ||  ||  || December 20, 2009 || SM Montmagastrel || Montmagastrell Obs. || RAF || align=right | 1.1 km || 
|-id=745 bgcolor=#E9E9E9
| 333745 ||  || — || December 19, 2009 || Kitt Peak || Spacewatch || WIT || align=right | 1.5 km || 
|-id=746 bgcolor=#E9E9E9
| 333746 ||  || — || October 1, 2008 || Mount Lemmon || Mount Lemmon Survey || — || align=right | 1.9 km || 
|-id=747 bgcolor=#d6d6d6
| 333747 ||  || — || January 13, 2010 || Socorro || LINEAR || — || align=right | 3.5 km || 
|-id=748 bgcolor=#d6d6d6
| 333748 ||  || — || December 18, 2009 || Kitt Peak || Spacewatch || — || align=right | 4.6 km || 
|-id=749 bgcolor=#fefefe
| 333749 ||  || — || January 7, 2010 || Kitt Peak || Spacewatch || — || align=right | 1.3 km || 
|-id=750 bgcolor=#E9E9E9
| 333750 ||  || — || January 17, 2010 || Dauban || F. Kugel || — || align=right | 2.3 km || 
|-id=751 bgcolor=#d6d6d6
| 333751 ||  || — || March 3, 2010 || Nazaret || G. Muler || — || align=right | 3.9 km || 
|-id=752 bgcolor=#d6d6d6
| 333752 ||  || — || March 4, 2005 || Mount Lemmon || Mount Lemmon Survey || HYG || align=right | 2.7 km || 
|-id=753 bgcolor=#d6d6d6
| 333753 ||  || — || March 18, 2010 || Mount Lemmon || Mount Lemmon Survey || HYG || align=right | 3.8 km || 
|-id=754 bgcolor=#E9E9E9
| 333754 ||  || — || October 6, 2005 || Mount Lemmon || Mount Lemmon Survey || — || align=right | 2.2 km || 
|-id=755 bgcolor=#FFC2E0
| 333755 ||  || — || November 2, 2010 || Catalina || CSS || APO || align=right data-sort-value="0.48" | 480 m || 
|-id=756 bgcolor=#fefefe
| 333756 ||  || — || April 10, 2002 || Socorro || LINEAR || — || align=right data-sort-value="0.79" | 790 m || 
|-id=757 bgcolor=#fefefe
| 333757 ||  || — || September 15, 2007 || Catalina || CSS || H || align=right data-sort-value="0.80" | 800 m || 
|-id=758 bgcolor=#fefefe
| 333758 ||  || — || September 21, 2001 || Socorro || LINEAR || — || align=right data-sort-value="0.96" | 960 m || 
|-id=759 bgcolor=#fefefe
| 333759 ||  || — || January 9, 2007 || Kitt Peak || Spacewatch || — || align=right | 3.6 km || 
|-id=760 bgcolor=#E9E9E9
| 333760 ||  || — || March 13, 2007 || Lulin Observatory || C.-S. Lin, Q.-z. Ye || JUN || align=right | 1.6 km || 
|-id=761 bgcolor=#fefefe
| 333761 ||  || — || August 29, 2005 || Kitt Peak || Spacewatch || V || align=right data-sort-value="0.75" | 750 m || 
|-id=762 bgcolor=#fefefe
| 333762 ||  || — || February 12, 2004 || Kitt Peak || Spacewatch || NYS || align=right data-sort-value="0.79" | 790 m || 
|-id=763 bgcolor=#fefefe
| 333763 ||  || — || January 2, 1998 || Kitt Peak || Spacewatch || — || align=right data-sort-value="0.62" | 620 m || 
|-id=764 bgcolor=#fefefe
| 333764 ||  || — || January 27, 2007 || Mount Lemmon || Mount Lemmon Survey || — || align=right data-sort-value="0.98" | 980 m || 
|-id=765 bgcolor=#E9E9E9
| 333765 ||  || — || December 28, 2005 || Kitt Peak || Spacewatch || — || align=right | 2.5 km || 
|-id=766 bgcolor=#fefefe
| 333766 ||  || — || June 29, 2005 || Palomar || NEAT || — || align=right data-sort-value="0.88" | 880 m || 
|-id=767 bgcolor=#E9E9E9
| 333767 ||  || — || January 31, 1997 || Kitt Peak || Spacewatch || — || align=right | 3.2 km || 
|-id=768 bgcolor=#fefefe
| 333768 ||  || — || July 4, 2005 || Palomar || NEAT || — || align=right | 1.1 km || 
|-id=769 bgcolor=#d6d6d6
| 333769 ||  || — || December 1, 2005 || Kitt Peak || M. W. Buie || — || align=right | 3.5 km || 
|-id=770 bgcolor=#E9E9E9
| 333770 ||  || — || May 15, 2007 || La Sagra || OAM Obs. || — || align=right | 3.0 km || 
|-id=771 bgcolor=#fefefe
| 333771 ||  || — || November 16, 2006 || Mount Lemmon || Mount Lemmon Survey || V || align=right data-sort-value="0.83" | 830 m || 
|-id=772 bgcolor=#d6d6d6
| 333772 ||  || — || October 23, 2003 || Kitt Peak || Spacewatch || — || align=right | 2.8 km || 
|-id=773 bgcolor=#d6d6d6
| 333773 ||  || — || February 19, 2010 || Mount Lemmon || Mount Lemmon Survey || — || align=right | 5.0 km || 
|-id=774 bgcolor=#d6d6d6
| 333774 ||  || — || October 18, 2003 || Anderson Mesa || LONEOS || 615 || align=right | 1.9 km || 
|-id=775 bgcolor=#E9E9E9
| 333775 ||  || — || January 27, 2006 || Mount Lemmon || Mount Lemmon Survey || — || align=right | 2.1 km || 
|-id=776 bgcolor=#d6d6d6
| 333776 ||  || — || October 23, 2003 || Kitt Peak || Spacewatch || — || align=right | 4.2 km || 
|-id=777 bgcolor=#fefefe
| 333777 ||  || — || November 10, 2005 || Kitt Peak || Spacewatch || — || align=right | 1.4 km || 
|-id=778 bgcolor=#E9E9E9
| 333778 ||  || — || April 25, 2007 || Kitt Peak || Spacewatch || — || align=right | 1.6 km || 
|-id=779 bgcolor=#E9E9E9
| 333779 ||  || — || September 5, 2000 || Kitt Peak || Spacewatch || — || align=right | 1.4 km || 
|-id=780 bgcolor=#E9E9E9
| 333780 ||  || — || May 29, 2008 || Mount Lemmon || Mount Lemmon Survey || GEF || align=right | 1.5 km || 
|-id=781 bgcolor=#d6d6d6
| 333781 ||  || — || September 27, 2003 || Kitt Peak || Spacewatch || — || align=right | 2.6 km || 
|-id=782 bgcolor=#fefefe
| 333782 ||  || — || December 8, 2005 || Kitt Peak || Spacewatch || NYS || align=right | 1.1 km || 
|-id=783 bgcolor=#E9E9E9
| 333783 ||  || — || January 6, 2006 || Catalina || CSS || — || align=right | 3.2 km || 
|-id=784 bgcolor=#E9E9E9
| 333784 ||  || — || June 27, 2008 || Siding Spring || SSS || — || align=right | 1.6 km || 
|-id=785 bgcolor=#d6d6d6
| 333785 ||  || — || September 4, 2008 || Kitt Peak || Spacewatch || — || align=right | 2.8 km || 
|-id=786 bgcolor=#fefefe
| 333786 ||  || — || September 11, 2001 || Anderson Mesa || LONEOS || V || align=right data-sort-value="0.84" | 840 m || 
|-id=787 bgcolor=#d6d6d6
| 333787 ||  || — || April 15, 1994 || Kitt Peak || Spacewatch || — || align=right | 4.4 km || 
|-id=788 bgcolor=#E9E9E9
| 333788 ||  || — || March 9, 2002 || Anderson Mesa || LONEOS || AER || align=right | 2.1 km || 
|-id=789 bgcolor=#d6d6d6
| 333789 ||  || — || February 28, 2006 || Catalina || CSS || — || align=right | 4.3 km || 
|-id=790 bgcolor=#E9E9E9
| 333790 ||  || — || June 12, 2007 || Kitt Peak || Spacewatch || PAD || align=right | 2.7 km || 
|-id=791 bgcolor=#E9E9E9
| 333791 ||  || — || September 22, 2008 || Socorro || LINEAR || PAD || align=right | 2.1 km || 
|-id=792 bgcolor=#E9E9E9
| 333792 ||  || — || April 13, 2002 || Palomar || NEAT || NEM || align=right | 3.2 km || 
|-id=793 bgcolor=#E9E9E9
| 333793 ||  || — || March 5, 2002 || Apache Point || SDSS || — || align=right | 1.8 km || 
|-id=794 bgcolor=#d6d6d6
| 333794 ||  || — || October 27, 2008 || Mount Lemmon || Mount Lemmon Survey || — || align=right | 4.4 km || 
|-id=795 bgcolor=#d6d6d6
| 333795 ||  || — || January 11, 2010 || Kitt Peak || Spacewatch || — || align=right | 4.0 km || 
|-id=796 bgcolor=#d6d6d6
| 333796 ||  || — || January 17, 2004 || Kitt Peak || Spacewatch || — || align=right | 4.7 km || 
|-id=797 bgcolor=#d6d6d6
| 333797 ||  || — || December 28, 2003 || Kitt Peak || Spacewatch || — || align=right | 4.2 km || 
|-id=798 bgcolor=#d6d6d6
| 333798 ||  || — || August 22, 2001 || Kitt Peak || Spacewatch || THM || align=right | 2.6 km || 
|-id=799 bgcolor=#d6d6d6
| 333799 ||  || — || May 23, 2006 || Kitt Peak || Spacewatch || — || align=right | 4.1 km || 
|-id=800 bgcolor=#d6d6d6
| 333800 ||  || — || September 20, 2007 || Kitt Peak || Spacewatch || EOS || align=right | 2.5 km || 
|}

333801–333900 

|-bgcolor=#d6d6d6
| 333801 ||  || — || September 20, 2001 || Socorro || LINEAR || VER || align=right | 3.0 km || 
|-id=802 bgcolor=#d6d6d6
| 333802 ||  || — || September 15, 2007 || Mount Lemmon || Mount Lemmon Survey || — || align=right | 3.5 km || 
|-id=803 bgcolor=#d6d6d6
| 333803 ||  || — || September 12, 2007 || Mount Lemmon || Mount Lemmon Survey || EOS || align=right | 2.3 km || 
|-id=804 bgcolor=#fefefe
| 333804 ||  || — || September 12, 2005 || Kitt Peak || Spacewatch || — || align=right data-sort-value="0.91" | 910 m || 
|-id=805 bgcolor=#fefefe
| 333805 ||  || — || January 7, 2006 || Kitt Peak || Spacewatch || — || align=right | 1.4 km || 
|-id=806 bgcolor=#d6d6d6
| 333806 ||  || — || February 3, 2000 || Socorro || LINEAR || — || align=right | 3.7 km || 
|-id=807 bgcolor=#d6d6d6
| 333807 ||  || — || September 14, 2007 || Catalina || CSS || ELF || align=right | 6.0 km || 
|-id=808 bgcolor=#E9E9E9
| 333808 ||  || — || November 26, 1995 || Xinglong || SCAP || JUN || align=right | 1.7 km || 
|-id=809 bgcolor=#fefefe
| 333809 ||  || — || October 19, 2000 || Kitt Peak || Spacewatch || V || align=right data-sort-value="0.88" | 880 m || 
|-id=810 bgcolor=#E9E9E9
| 333810 ||  || — || November 1, 2007 || Kitt Peak || Spacewatch || MAR || align=right | 1.3 km || 
|-id=811 bgcolor=#E9E9E9
| 333811 ||  || — || September 28, 2006 || Kitt Peak || Spacewatch || PAD || align=right | 2.0 km || 
|-id=812 bgcolor=#E9E9E9
| 333812 ||  || — || April 1, 2004 || Siding Spring || SSS || — || align=right | 2.6 km || 
|-id=813 bgcolor=#fefefe
| 333813 ||  || — || January 29, 1995 || Kitt Peak || Spacewatch || — || align=right data-sort-value="0.65" | 650 m || 
|-id=814 bgcolor=#d6d6d6
| 333814 ||  || — || October 6, 2004 || Kitt Peak || Spacewatch || — || align=right | 2.8 km || 
|-id=815 bgcolor=#d6d6d6
| 333815 ||  || — || August 9, 2002 || Cerro Tololo || M. W. Buie || — || align=right | 3.0 km || 
|-id=816 bgcolor=#E9E9E9
| 333816 ||  || — || August 31, 2005 || Kitt Peak || Spacewatch || — || align=right | 1.1 km || 
|-id=817 bgcolor=#d6d6d6
| 333817 ||  || — || January 29, 1995 || Kitt Peak || Spacewatch || — || align=right | 4.1 km || 
|-id=818 bgcolor=#d6d6d6
| 333818 ||  || — || April 23, 1996 || Kitt Peak || Spacewatch || — || align=right | 3.6 km || 
|-id=819 bgcolor=#E9E9E9
| 333819 ||  || — || March 9, 2003 || Anderson Mesa || LONEOS || EUN || align=right | 1.9 km || 
|-id=820 bgcolor=#E9E9E9
| 333820 ||  || — || February 21, 2003 || Palomar || NEAT || JUN || align=right | 1.4 km || 
|-id=821 bgcolor=#d6d6d6
| 333821 ||  || — || October 24, 2005 || Mauna Kea || A. Boattini || — || align=right | 3.9 km || 
|-id=822 bgcolor=#E9E9E9
| 333822 ||  || — || April 28, 2008 || Mount Lemmon || Mount Lemmon Survey || — || align=right | 1.2 km || 
|-id=823 bgcolor=#fefefe
| 333823 ||  || — || March 26, 1995 || Kitt Peak || Spacewatch || — || align=right data-sort-value="0.89" | 890 m || 
|-id=824 bgcolor=#fefefe
| 333824 ||  || — || February 5, 2000 || Kitt Peak || Spacewatch || — || align=right data-sort-value="0.86" | 860 m || 
|-id=825 bgcolor=#E9E9E9
| 333825 ||  || — || May 3, 2008 || Kitt Peak || Spacewatch || — || align=right | 1.5 km || 
|-id=826 bgcolor=#d6d6d6
| 333826 ||  || — || October 3, 1997 || Caussols || ODAS || VER || align=right | 4.7 km || 
|-id=827 bgcolor=#d6d6d6
| 333827 ||  || — || October 15, 2004 || Kitt Peak || Spacewatch || EOS || align=right | 4.7 km || 
|-id=828 bgcolor=#E9E9E9
| 333828 ||  || — || November 22, 2006 || Kitt Peak || Spacewatch || — || align=right | 1.3 km || 
|-id=829 bgcolor=#d6d6d6
| 333829 ||  || — || May 25, 2007 || Mount Lemmon || Mount Lemmon Survey || HYG || align=right | 4.6 km || 
|-id=830 bgcolor=#E9E9E9
| 333830 ||  || — || September 16, 2009 || Kitt Peak || Spacewatch || — || align=right | 1.3 km || 
|-id=831 bgcolor=#E9E9E9
| 333831 ||  || — || May 8, 1999 || Socorro || CSS || — || align=right | 2.2 km || 
|-id=832 bgcolor=#d6d6d6
| 333832 ||  || — || May 13, 1996 || Kitt Peak || Spacewatch || — || align=right | 4.8 km || 
|-id=833 bgcolor=#E9E9E9
| 333833 ||  || — || November 27, 2000 || Kitt Peak || Spacewatch || — || align=right | 3.4 km || 
|-id=834 bgcolor=#d6d6d6
| 333834 ||  || — || May 23, 2001 || Apache Point || SDSS || — || align=right | 5.7 km || 
|-id=835 bgcolor=#d6d6d6
| 333835 ||  || — || December 11, 2004 || Kitt Peak || Spacewatch || — || align=right | 3.7 km || 
|-id=836 bgcolor=#E9E9E9
| 333836 ||  || — || July 14, 2004 || Socorro || LINEAR || — || align=right | 1.3 km || 
|-id=837 bgcolor=#d6d6d6
| 333837 ||  || — || December 13, 1999 || Kitt Peak || Spacewatch || — || align=right | 3.8 km || 
|-id=838 bgcolor=#d6d6d6
| 333838 ||  || — || December 19, 2003 || Kitt Peak || Spacewatch || — || align=right | 4.2 km || 
|-id=839 bgcolor=#fefefe
| 333839 ||  || — || June 2, 2002 || Palomar || NEAT || — || align=right data-sort-value="0.84" | 840 m || 
|-id=840 bgcolor=#E9E9E9
| 333840 ||  || — || September 18, 2004 || Socorro || LINEAR || — || align=right | 1.3 km || 
|-id=841 bgcolor=#E9E9E9
| 333841 ||  || — || October 17, 1977 || Palomar || PLS || — || align=right | 1.5 km || 
|-id=842 bgcolor=#E9E9E9
| 333842 || 1960 SV || — || September 24, 1960 || Palomar || L. D. Schmadel, R. M. Stoss || — || align=right data-sort-value="0.95" | 950 m || 
|-id=843 bgcolor=#fefefe
| 333843 ||  || — || September 17, 1990 || Kitt Peak || Spacewatch || — || align=right data-sort-value="0.78" | 780 m || 
|-id=844 bgcolor=#E9E9E9
| 333844 || 1990 WQ || — || November 18, 1990 || La Silla || E. W. Elst || — || align=right | 2.5 km || 
|-id=845 bgcolor=#E9E9E9
| 333845 ||  || — || October 10, 1991 || Kitt Peak || Spacewatch || — || align=right | 1.7 km || 
|-id=846 bgcolor=#E9E9E9
| 333846 ||  || — || September 28, 1992 || Kitt Peak || Spacewatch || — || align=right data-sort-value="0.87" | 870 m || 
|-id=847 bgcolor=#fefefe
| 333847 ||  || — || December 16, 1993 || Kitt Peak || Spacewatch || H || align=right data-sort-value="0.83" | 830 m || 
|-id=848 bgcolor=#E9E9E9
| 333848 ||  || — || September 27, 1994 || Kitt Peak || Spacewatch || WIT || align=right | 1.1 km || 
|-id=849 bgcolor=#E9E9E9
| 333849 ||  || — || October 28, 1994 || Kitt Peak || Spacewatch || HOF || align=right | 2.6 km || 
|-id=850 bgcolor=#E9E9E9
| 333850 ||  || — || February 1, 1995 || Kitt Peak || Spacewatch || — || align=right | 1.0 km || 
|-id=851 bgcolor=#E9E9E9
| 333851 ||  || — || March 23, 1995 || Kitt Peak || Spacewatch || — || align=right | 1.2 km || 
|-id=852 bgcolor=#fefefe
| 333852 ||  || — || March 27, 1995 || Kitt Peak || Spacewatch || — || align=right data-sort-value="0.70" | 700 m || 
|-id=853 bgcolor=#fefefe
| 333853 ||  || — || September 17, 1995 || Kitt Peak || Spacewatch || — || align=right data-sort-value="0.77" | 770 m || 
|-id=854 bgcolor=#E9E9E9
| 333854 ||  || — || September 18, 1995 || Kitt Peak || Spacewatch || — || align=right | 1.7 km || 
|-id=855 bgcolor=#fefefe
| 333855 ||  || — || September 24, 1995 || Kitt Peak || Spacewatch || — || align=right data-sort-value="0.98" | 980 m || 
|-id=856 bgcolor=#fefefe
| 333856 ||  || — || September 25, 1995 || Kitt Peak || Spacewatch || — || align=right data-sort-value="0.78" | 780 m || 
|-id=857 bgcolor=#fefefe
| 333857 ||  || — || September 19, 1995 || Kitt Peak || Spacewatch || — || align=right data-sort-value="0.68" | 680 m || 
|-id=858 bgcolor=#E9E9E9
| 333858 ||  || — || September 19, 1995 || Kitt Peak || Spacewatch || — || align=right | 2.1 km || 
|-id=859 bgcolor=#E9E9E9
| 333859 ||  || — || October 15, 1995 || Kitt Peak || Spacewatch || — || align=right | 1.7 km || 
|-id=860 bgcolor=#E9E9E9
| 333860 ||  || — || October 23, 1995 || Kitt Peak || Spacewatch || — || align=right | 1.7 km || 
|-id=861 bgcolor=#d6d6d6
| 333861 ||  || — || October 23, 1995 || Kitt Peak || Spacewatch || — || align=right | 3.2 km || 
|-id=862 bgcolor=#fefefe
| 333862 ||  || — || November 16, 1995 || Kuma Kogen || A. Nakamura || — || align=right data-sort-value="0.63" | 630 m || 
|-id=863 bgcolor=#d6d6d6
| 333863 ||  || — || November 16, 1995 || Kitt Peak || Spacewatch || — || align=right | 3.4 km || 
|-id=864 bgcolor=#fefefe
| 333864 ||  || — || January 12, 1996 || Kitt Peak || Spacewatch || — || align=right | 1.0 km || 
|-id=865 bgcolor=#E9E9E9
| 333865 ||  || — || January 15, 1996 || Kitt Peak || Spacewatch || — || align=right | 2.4 km || 
|-id=866 bgcolor=#d6d6d6
| 333866 ||  || — || March 11, 1996 || Kitt Peak || Spacewatch || 615 || align=right | 1.7 km || 
|-id=867 bgcolor=#d6d6d6
| 333867 ||  || — || September 6, 1996 || Kitt Peak || Spacewatch || — || align=right | 3.6 km || 
|-id=868 bgcolor=#d6d6d6
| 333868 ||  || — || October 4, 1996 || Kitt Peak || Spacewatch || — || align=right | 3.5 km || 
|-id=869 bgcolor=#d6d6d6
| 333869 ||  || — || October 10, 1996 || Kitt Peak || Spacewatch || URS || align=right | 3.3 km || 
|-id=870 bgcolor=#fefefe
| 333870 ||  || — || March 3, 1997 || Kitt Peak || Spacewatch || — || align=right data-sort-value="0.85" | 850 m || 
|-id=871 bgcolor=#E9E9E9
| 333871 ||  || — || March 10, 1997 || Kitt Peak || Spacewatch || — || align=right | 3.0 km || 
|-id=872 bgcolor=#fefefe
| 333872 ||  || — || April 28, 1997 || Kitt Peak || Spacewatch || — || align=right data-sort-value="0.87" | 870 m || 
|-id=873 bgcolor=#fefefe
| 333873 ||  || — || September 28, 1997 || Needville || Needville Obs. || NYS || align=right data-sort-value="0.84" | 840 m || 
|-id=874 bgcolor=#E9E9E9
| 333874 ||  || — || September 29, 1997 || Kitt Peak || Spacewatch || — || align=right | 1.3 km || 
|-id=875 bgcolor=#E9E9E9
| 333875 ||  || — || September 29, 1997 || Kitt Peak || Spacewatch || — || align=right data-sort-value="0.71" | 710 m || 
|-id=876 bgcolor=#fefefe
| 333876 ||  || — || September 30, 1997 || Kitt Peak || Spacewatch || V || align=right data-sort-value="0.82" | 820 m || 
|-id=877 bgcolor=#d6d6d6
| 333877 ||  || — || October 2, 1997 || Kitt Peak || Spacewatch || — || align=right | 3.7 km || 
|-id=878 bgcolor=#d6d6d6
| 333878 ||  || — || November 24, 1997 || Kitt Peak || Spacewatch || URS || align=right | 7.2 km || 
|-id=879 bgcolor=#d6d6d6
| 333879 ||  || — || November 22, 1997 || Kitt Peak || Spacewatch || — || align=right | 3.5 km || 
|-id=880 bgcolor=#d6d6d6
| 333880 ||  || — || December 27, 1997 || Kitt Peak || Spacewatch || HYG || align=right | 3.1 km || 
|-id=881 bgcolor=#d6d6d6
| 333881 ||  || — || January 22, 1998 || Kitt Peak || Spacewatch || — || align=right | 4.1 km || 
|-id=882 bgcolor=#E9E9E9
| 333882 ||  || — || April 17, 1998 || Kitt Peak || Spacewatch || — || align=right | 1.3 km || 
|-id=883 bgcolor=#E9E9E9
| 333883 ||  || — || April 20, 1998 || Kitt Peak || Spacewatch || EUN || align=right | 1.4 km || 
|-id=884 bgcolor=#fefefe
| 333884 ||  || — || April 29, 1998 || Kitt Peak || Spacewatch || — || align=right | 1.2 km || 
|-id=885 bgcolor=#d6d6d6
| 333885 ||  || — || August 24, 1998 || Socorro || LINEAR || — || align=right | 4.6 km || 
|-id=886 bgcolor=#fefefe
| 333886 ||  || — || September 14, 1998 || Socorro || LINEAR || FLO || align=right data-sort-value="0.79" | 790 m || 
|-id=887 bgcolor=#fefefe
| 333887 ||  || — || September 14, 1998 || Socorro || LINEAR || V || align=right data-sort-value="0.95" | 950 m || 
|-id=888 bgcolor=#FFC2E0
| 333888 ||  || — || September 19, 1998 || Socorro || LINEAR || AMO +1km || align=right | 1.6 km || 
|-id=889 bgcolor=#FFC2E0
| 333889 ||  || — || September 19, 1998 || Socorro || LINEAR || ATE +1km || align=right data-sort-value="0.92" | 920 m || 
|-id=890 bgcolor=#fefefe
| 333890 ||  || — || September 17, 1998 || Anderson Mesa || LONEOS || — || align=right | 1.2 km || 
|-id=891 bgcolor=#fefefe
| 333891 ||  || — || September 25, 1998 || Kitt Peak || Spacewatch || EUT || align=right data-sort-value="0.65" | 650 m || 
|-id=892 bgcolor=#fefefe
| 333892 ||  || — || September 27, 1998 || Kitt Peak || Spacewatch || NYS || align=right data-sort-value="0.88" | 880 m || 
|-id=893 bgcolor=#fefefe
| 333893 ||  || — || September 30, 1998 || Kitt Peak || Spacewatch || — || align=right data-sort-value="0.85" | 850 m || 
|-id=894 bgcolor=#FA8072
| 333894 ||  || — || September 26, 1998 || Socorro || LINEAR || — || align=right | 1.0 km || 
|-id=895 bgcolor=#fefefe
| 333895 ||  || — || January 19, 1999 || Kitt Peak || Spacewatch || NYS || align=right data-sort-value="0.70" | 700 m || 
|-id=896 bgcolor=#d6d6d6
| 333896 ||  || — || January 22, 1999 || Kitt Peak || Spacewatch || TEL || align=right | 1.6 km || 
|-id=897 bgcolor=#E9E9E9
| 333897 ||  || — || September 7, 1999 || Socorro || LINEAR || — || align=right | 2.2 km || 
|-id=898 bgcolor=#E9E9E9
| 333898 ||  || — || September 7, 1999 || Socorro || LINEAR || — || align=right | 2.2 km || 
|-id=899 bgcolor=#E9E9E9
| 333899 ||  || — || September 7, 1999 || Socorro || LINEAR || — || align=right | 3.3 km || 
|-id=900 bgcolor=#E9E9E9
| 333900 ||  || — || September 7, 1999 || Socorro || LINEAR || JUN || align=right | 1.0 km || 
|}

333901–334000 

|-bgcolor=#FA8072
| 333901 ||  || — || September 9, 1999 || Socorro || LINEAR || — || align=right | 1.7 km || 
|-id=902 bgcolor=#E9E9E9
| 333902 ||  || — || September 13, 1999 || Kitt Peak || Spacewatch || — || align=right | 1.5 km || 
|-id=903 bgcolor=#E9E9E9
| 333903 ||  || — || September 9, 1999 || Socorro || LINEAR || — || align=right | 1.7 km || 
|-id=904 bgcolor=#E9E9E9
| 333904 ||  || — || September 9, 1999 || Socorro || LINEAR || — || align=right | 1.6 km || 
|-id=905 bgcolor=#fefefe
| 333905 ||  || — || September 11, 1999 || Socorro || LINEAR || — || align=right data-sort-value="0.71" | 710 m || 
|-id=906 bgcolor=#E9E9E9
| 333906 ||  || — || September 8, 1999 || Socorro || LINEAR || JUN || align=right | 1.4 km || 
|-id=907 bgcolor=#fefefe
| 333907 ||  || — || October 2, 1999 || Kitt Peak || Spacewatch || — || align=right data-sort-value="0.70" | 700 m || 
|-id=908 bgcolor=#FFC2E0
| 333908 ||  || — || October 10, 1999 || Socorro || LINEAR || AMO +1km || align=right | 1.1 km || 
|-id=909 bgcolor=#E9E9E9
| 333909 ||  || — || October 2, 1999 || Kitt Peak || Spacewatch || — || align=right | 2.2 km || 
|-id=910 bgcolor=#E9E9E9
| 333910 ||  || — || October 3, 1999 || Kitt Peak || Spacewatch || — || align=right | 1.1 km || 
|-id=911 bgcolor=#E9E9E9
| 333911 ||  || — || October 7, 1999 || Kitt Peak || Spacewatch || — || align=right | 1.5 km || 
|-id=912 bgcolor=#E9E9E9
| 333912 ||  || — || October 8, 1999 || Kitt Peak || Spacewatch || — || align=right | 1.6 km || 
|-id=913 bgcolor=#E9E9E9
| 333913 ||  || — || October 12, 1999 || Kitt Peak || Spacewatch || — || align=right | 1.7 km || 
|-id=914 bgcolor=#E9E9E9
| 333914 ||  || — || October 4, 1999 || Socorro || LINEAR || EUN || align=right | 1.8 km || 
|-id=915 bgcolor=#E9E9E9
| 333915 ||  || — || October 4, 1999 || Socorro || LINEAR || — || align=right | 2.4 km || 
|-id=916 bgcolor=#fefefe
| 333916 ||  || — || October 4, 1999 || Socorro || LINEAR || — || align=right data-sort-value="0.75" | 750 m || 
|-id=917 bgcolor=#E9E9E9
| 333917 ||  || — || October 4, 1999 || Socorro || LINEAR || — || align=right | 1.7 km || 
|-id=918 bgcolor=#E9E9E9
| 333918 ||  || — || October 6, 1999 || Socorro || LINEAR || — || align=right | 2.3 km || 
|-id=919 bgcolor=#E9E9E9
| 333919 ||  || — || October 9, 1999 || Socorro || LINEAR || — || align=right | 1.8 km || 
|-id=920 bgcolor=#E9E9E9
| 333920 ||  || — || October 9, 1999 || Socorro || LINEAR || — || align=right | 2.3 km || 
|-id=921 bgcolor=#E9E9E9
| 333921 ||  || — || October 9, 1999 || Socorro || LINEAR || — || align=right | 2.9 km || 
|-id=922 bgcolor=#E9E9E9
| 333922 ||  || — || October 10, 1999 || Socorro || LINEAR || — || align=right | 2.2 km || 
|-id=923 bgcolor=#E9E9E9
| 333923 ||  || — || October 9, 1999 || Catalina || CSS || — || align=right | 2.0 km || 
|-id=924 bgcolor=#d6d6d6
| 333924 ||  || — || October 6, 1999 || Socorro || LINEAR || EOS || align=right | 2.0 km || 
|-id=925 bgcolor=#E9E9E9
| 333925 ||  || — || October 3, 1999 || Socorro || LINEAR || JUN || align=right | 1.3 km || 
|-id=926 bgcolor=#fefefe
| 333926 ||  || — || October 2, 1999 || Kitt Peak || Spacewatch || V || align=right data-sort-value="0.75" | 750 m || 
|-id=927 bgcolor=#E9E9E9
| 333927 ||  || — || October 9, 1999 || Socorro || LINEAR || — || align=right | 1.9 km || 
|-id=928 bgcolor=#E9E9E9
| 333928 ||  || — || October 13, 1999 || Apache Point || SDSS || — || align=right | 2.7 km || 
|-id=929 bgcolor=#E9E9E9
| 333929 ||  || — || October 16, 1999 || Siding Spring || R. H. McNaught || — || align=right | 4.1 km || 
|-id=930 bgcolor=#E9E9E9
| 333930 ||  || — || October 29, 1999 || Catalina || CSS || — || align=right | 2.7 km || 
|-id=931 bgcolor=#E9E9E9
| 333931 ||  || — || October 28, 1999 || Catalina || CSS || — || align=right | 2.7 km || 
|-id=932 bgcolor=#E9E9E9
| 333932 ||  || — || October 31, 1999 || Kitt Peak || Spacewatch || HEN || align=right | 1.1 km || 
|-id=933 bgcolor=#E9E9E9
| 333933 ||  || — || November 2, 1999 || Kitt Peak || Spacewatch || — || align=right | 2.9 km || 
|-id=934 bgcolor=#E9E9E9
| 333934 ||  || — || November 3, 1999 || Kitt Peak || Spacewatch || PAD || align=right | 2.9 km || 
|-id=935 bgcolor=#E9E9E9
| 333935 ||  || — || November 4, 1999 || Socorro || LINEAR || — || align=right | 2.9 km || 
|-id=936 bgcolor=#E9E9E9
| 333936 ||  || — || November 5, 1999 || Socorro || LINEAR || — || align=right | 2.2 km || 
|-id=937 bgcolor=#E9E9E9
| 333937 ||  || — || November 9, 1999 || Socorro || LINEAR || NEM || align=right | 2.2 km || 
|-id=938 bgcolor=#E9E9E9
| 333938 ||  || — || November 3, 1999 || Kitt Peak || Spacewatch || — || align=right | 2.3 km || 
|-id=939 bgcolor=#E9E9E9
| 333939 ||  || — || November 4, 1999 || Kitt Peak || Spacewatch || — || align=right | 2.6 km || 
|-id=940 bgcolor=#E9E9E9
| 333940 ||  || — || November 6, 1999 || Kitt Peak || Spacewatch || — || align=right | 2.4 km || 
|-id=941 bgcolor=#E9E9E9
| 333941 ||  || — || November 9, 1999 || Socorro || LINEAR || HEN || align=right | 1.3 km || 
|-id=942 bgcolor=#E9E9E9
| 333942 ||  || — || November 14, 1999 || Socorro || LINEAR || GAL || align=right | 1.7 km || 
|-id=943 bgcolor=#E9E9E9
| 333943 ||  || — || November 14, 1999 || Socorro || LINEAR || — || align=right | 2.0 km || 
|-id=944 bgcolor=#E9E9E9
| 333944 ||  || — || November 6, 1999 || Socorro || LINEAR || — || align=right | 2.8 km || 
|-id=945 bgcolor=#E9E9E9
| 333945 ||  || — || November 1, 1999 || Catalina || CSS || — || align=right | 2.2 km || 
|-id=946 bgcolor=#E9E9E9
| 333946 ||  || — || November 12, 1999 || Socorro || LINEAR || — || align=right | 2.3 km || 
|-id=947 bgcolor=#fefefe
| 333947 ||  || — || December 6, 1999 || Socorro || LINEAR || FLO || align=right data-sort-value="0.92" | 920 m || 
|-id=948 bgcolor=#FA8072
| 333948 ||  || — || December 6, 1999 || Socorro || LINEAR || unusual || align=right | 2.8 km || 
|-id=949 bgcolor=#d6d6d6
| 333949 ||  || — || December 8, 1999 || Kitt Peak || Spacewatch || EOS || align=right | 2.6 km || 
|-id=950 bgcolor=#E9E9E9
| 333950 ||  || — || December 9, 1999 || Kitt Peak || Spacewatch || — || align=right data-sort-value="0.99" | 990 m || 
|-id=951 bgcolor=#E9E9E9
| 333951 ||  || — || January 4, 2000 || Socorro || LINEAR || GAL || align=right | 2.7 km || 
|-id=952 bgcolor=#E9E9E9
| 333952 ||  || — || January 7, 2000 || Kitt Peak || Spacewatch || — || align=right | 3.4 km || 
|-id=953 bgcolor=#E9E9E9
| 333953 ||  || — || January 8, 2000 || Kitt Peak || Spacewatch || HOF || align=right | 3.4 km || 
|-id=954 bgcolor=#fefefe
| 333954 ||  || — || January 8, 2000 || Kitt Peak || Spacewatch || FLO || align=right data-sort-value="0.68" | 680 m || 
|-id=955 bgcolor=#E9E9E9
| 333955 ||  || — || January 4, 2000 || Socorro || LINEAR || — || align=right | 2.8 km || 
|-id=956 bgcolor=#E9E9E9
| 333956 ||  || — || January 26, 2000 || Kitt Peak || Spacewatch || GEF || align=right | 1.3 km || 
|-id=957 bgcolor=#d6d6d6
| 333957 ||  || — || February 1, 2000 || Kitt Peak || Spacewatch || BRA || align=right | 1.7 km || 
|-id=958 bgcolor=#d6d6d6
| 333958 ||  || — || February 8, 2000 || Kitt Peak || Spacewatch || — || align=right | 2.8 km || 
|-id=959 bgcolor=#fefefe
| 333959 ||  || — || February 3, 2000 || Kitt Peak || Spacewatch || — || align=right data-sort-value="0.86" | 860 m || 
|-id=960 bgcolor=#fefefe
| 333960 ||  || — || February 4, 2000 || Kitt Peak || Spacewatch || — || align=right data-sort-value="0.65" | 650 m || 
|-id=961 bgcolor=#d6d6d6
| 333961 ||  || — || March 3, 2000 || Socorro || LINEAR || — || align=right | 4.1 km || 
|-id=962 bgcolor=#fefefe
| 333962 ||  || — || March 3, 2000 || Socorro || LINEAR || — || align=right | 1.2 km || 
|-id=963 bgcolor=#fefefe
| 333963 ||  || — || March 3, 2000 || Socorro || LINEAR || — || align=right | 1.1 km || 
|-id=964 bgcolor=#fefefe
| 333964 ||  || — || March 8, 2000 || Socorro || LINEAR || — || align=right | 1.1 km || 
|-id=965 bgcolor=#fefefe
| 333965 ||  || — || March 30, 2000 || Kitt Peak || Spacewatch || — || align=right data-sort-value="0.82" | 820 m || 
|-id=966 bgcolor=#d6d6d6
| 333966 ||  || — || March 29, 2000 || Socorro || LINEAR || Tj (2.94) || align=right | 4.0 km || 
|-id=967 bgcolor=#fefefe
| 333967 ||  || — || March 29, 2000 || Socorro || LINEAR || — || align=right | 1.1 km || 
|-id=968 bgcolor=#d6d6d6
| 333968 ||  || — || April 5, 2000 || Socorro || LINEAR || — || align=right | 3.6 km || 
|-id=969 bgcolor=#fefefe
| 333969 ||  || — || April 8, 2000 || Kitt Peak || Spacewatch || H || align=right data-sort-value="0.71" | 710 m || 
|-id=970 bgcolor=#d6d6d6
| 333970 ||  || — || April 5, 2000 || Kitt Peak || Spacewatch || — || align=right | 2.6 km || 
|-id=971 bgcolor=#d6d6d6
| 333971 ||  || — || April 24, 2000 || Kitt Peak || Spacewatch || EOS || align=right | 2.4 km || 
|-id=972 bgcolor=#fefefe
| 333972 ||  || — || April 28, 2000 || Socorro || LINEAR || — || align=right | 1.4 km || 
|-id=973 bgcolor=#d6d6d6
| 333973 ||  || — || May 4, 2000 || Apache Point || SDSS || — || align=right | 4.5 km || 
|-id=974 bgcolor=#fefefe
| 333974 ||  || — || May 27, 2000 || Socorro || LINEAR || — || align=right | 1.3 km || 
|-id=975 bgcolor=#E9E9E9
| 333975 ||  || — || June 6, 2000 || Kitt Peak || Spacewatch || — || align=right | 1.1 km || 
|-id=976 bgcolor=#E9E9E9
| 333976 ||  || — || August 24, 2000 || Socorro || LINEAR || — || align=right | 1.1 km || 
|-id=977 bgcolor=#E9E9E9
| 333977 ||  || — || August 31, 2000 || Socorro || LINEAR || — || align=right | 1.1 km || 
|-id=978 bgcolor=#E9E9E9
| 333978 ||  || — || August 31, 2000 || Socorro || LINEAR || — || align=right | 1.4 km || 
|-id=979 bgcolor=#E9E9E9
| 333979 ||  || — || August 28, 2000 || Socorro || LINEAR || RAF || align=right | 1.4 km || 
|-id=980 bgcolor=#FA8072
| 333980 ||  || — || September 1, 2000 || Socorro || LINEAR || — || align=right | 2.2 km || 
|-id=981 bgcolor=#FA8072
| 333981 ||  || — || September 3, 2000 || Socorro || LINEAR || — || align=right data-sort-value="0.79" | 790 m || 
|-id=982 bgcolor=#E9E9E9
| 333982 ||  || — || September 23, 2000 || Socorro || LINEAR || JUL || align=right | 1.6 km || 
|-id=983 bgcolor=#E9E9E9
| 333983 ||  || — || September 22, 2000 || Socorro || LINEAR || — || align=right | 1.7 km || 
|-id=984 bgcolor=#fefefe
| 333984 ||  || — || September 23, 2000 || Socorro || LINEAR || — || align=right | 1.5 km || 
|-id=985 bgcolor=#E9E9E9
| 333985 ||  || — || September 25, 2000 || Haleakala || NEAT || — || align=right | 1.7 km || 
|-id=986 bgcolor=#E9E9E9
| 333986 ||  || — || September 24, 2000 || Socorro || LINEAR || — || align=right | 1.0 km || 
|-id=987 bgcolor=#E9E9E9
| 333987 ||  || — || September 28, 2000 || Socorro || LINEAR || — || align=right | 1.3 km || 
|-id=988 bgcolor=#E9E9E9
| 333988 ||  || — || September 28, 2000 || Socorro || LINEAR || — || align=right | 2.8 km || 
|-id=989 bgcolor=#fefefe
| 333989 ||  || — || September 24, 2000 || Socorro || LINEAR || NYS || align=right data-sort-value="0.81" | 810 m || 
|-id=990 bgcolor=#E9E9E9
| 333990 ||  || — || September 27, 2000 || Socorro || LINEAR || MAR || align=right | 1.2 km || 
|-id=991 bgcolor=#E9E9E9
| 333991 ||  || — || September 24, 2000 || Socorro || LINEAR || — || align=right data-sort-value="0.95" | 950 m || 
|-id=992 bgcolor=#E9E9E9
| 333992 ||  || — || September 25, 2000 || Socorro || LINEAR || — || align=right data-sort-value="0.92" | 920 m || 
|-id=993 bgcolor=#fefefe
| 333993 ||  || — || September 26, 2000 || Socorro || LINEAR || V || align=right | 1.2 km || 
|-id=994 bgcolor=#E9E9E9
| 333994 ||  || — || September 27, 2000 || Socorro || LINEAR || — || align=right | 1.9 km || 
|-id=995 bgcolor=#E9E9E9
| 333995 ||  || — || September 27, 2000 || Socorro || LINEAR || — || align=right | 1.7 km || 
|-id=996 bgcolor=#E9E9E9
| 333996 ||  || — || September 22, 2000 || Socorro || LINEAR || — || align=right | 2.6 km || 
|-id=997 bgcolor=#E9E9E9
| 333997 ||  || — || September 29, 2000 || Anderson Mesa || LONEOS || — || align=right | 1.3 km || 
|-id=998 bgcolor=#E9E9E9
| 333998 ||  || — || September 19, 2000 || Anderson Mesa || LONEOS || — || align=right | 1.4 km || 
|-id=999 bgcolor=#fefefe
| 333999 ||  || — || October 1, 2000 || Socorro || LINEAR || V || align=right data-sort-value="0.90" | 900 m || 
|-id=000 bgcolor=#d6d6d6
| 334000 ||  || — || October 2, 2000 || Kitt Peak || Spacewatch || — || align=right | 3.5 km || 
|}

References

External links 
 Discovery Circumstances: Numbered Minor Planets (330001)–(335000) (IAU Minor Planet Center)

0333